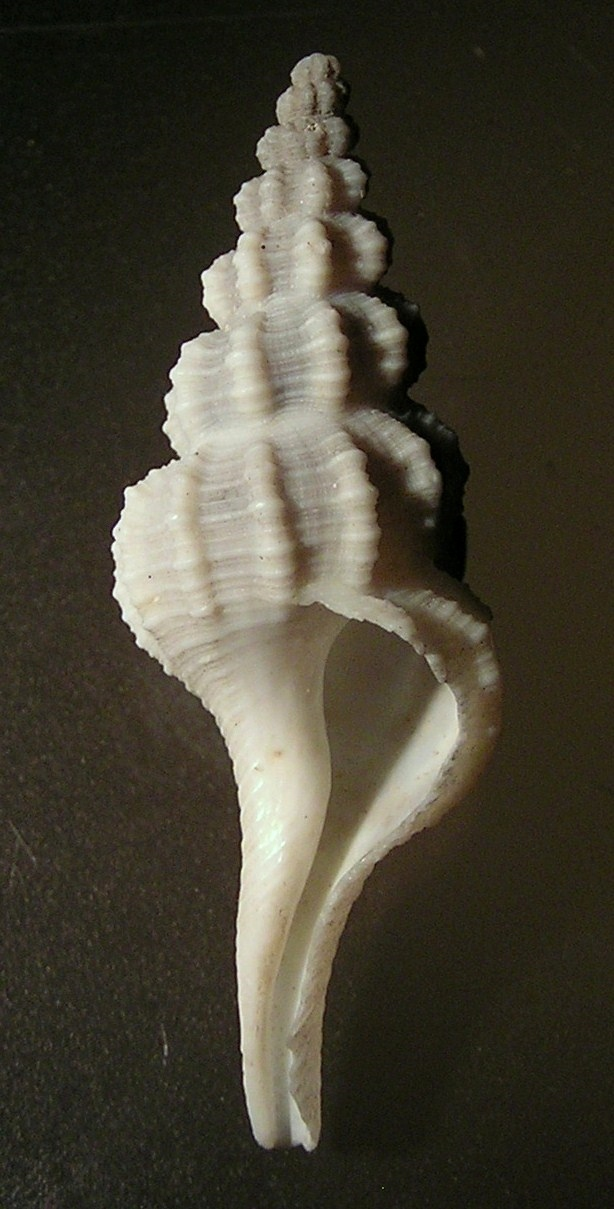
- Shell of Fusinus inglorius

Scientific classification
- Kingdom: Animalia
- Phylum: Mollusca
- Class: Gastropoda
- Subclass: Caenogastropoda
- Order: Neogastropoda
- Superfamily: Buccinoidea
- Family: Fasciolariidae
- Subfamily: Fusininae
- Genus: Fusinus; Rafinesque, 1815

Type species
- Murex colus Linnaeus, 1758

Synonyms
- Barbarofusus Grabau & Shimer, 1909; †Exilifusus Gabb, 1876; Fusinus (Barbarofusus) Grabau & Shimer, 1909; Fusinus (Sinistralia) H. Adams & A. Adams, 1853; Fusus Bruguière, 1789 (invalid: junior homonym of Fusus Helbling, 1779. Placed by the ICZN on the Official Index by Opinion 1765, 1994); †Gracilipurpura Jousseaume, 1881; Heilprinia Grabau, 1904; Propefusus Iredale, 1924; Sinistralia H. Adams & A. Adams, 1853; Tritonium (Fusus) Bruguière, 1789

= Fusinus =

Fusinus Temporal range: Cretaceous – Recent

Genus of gastropods

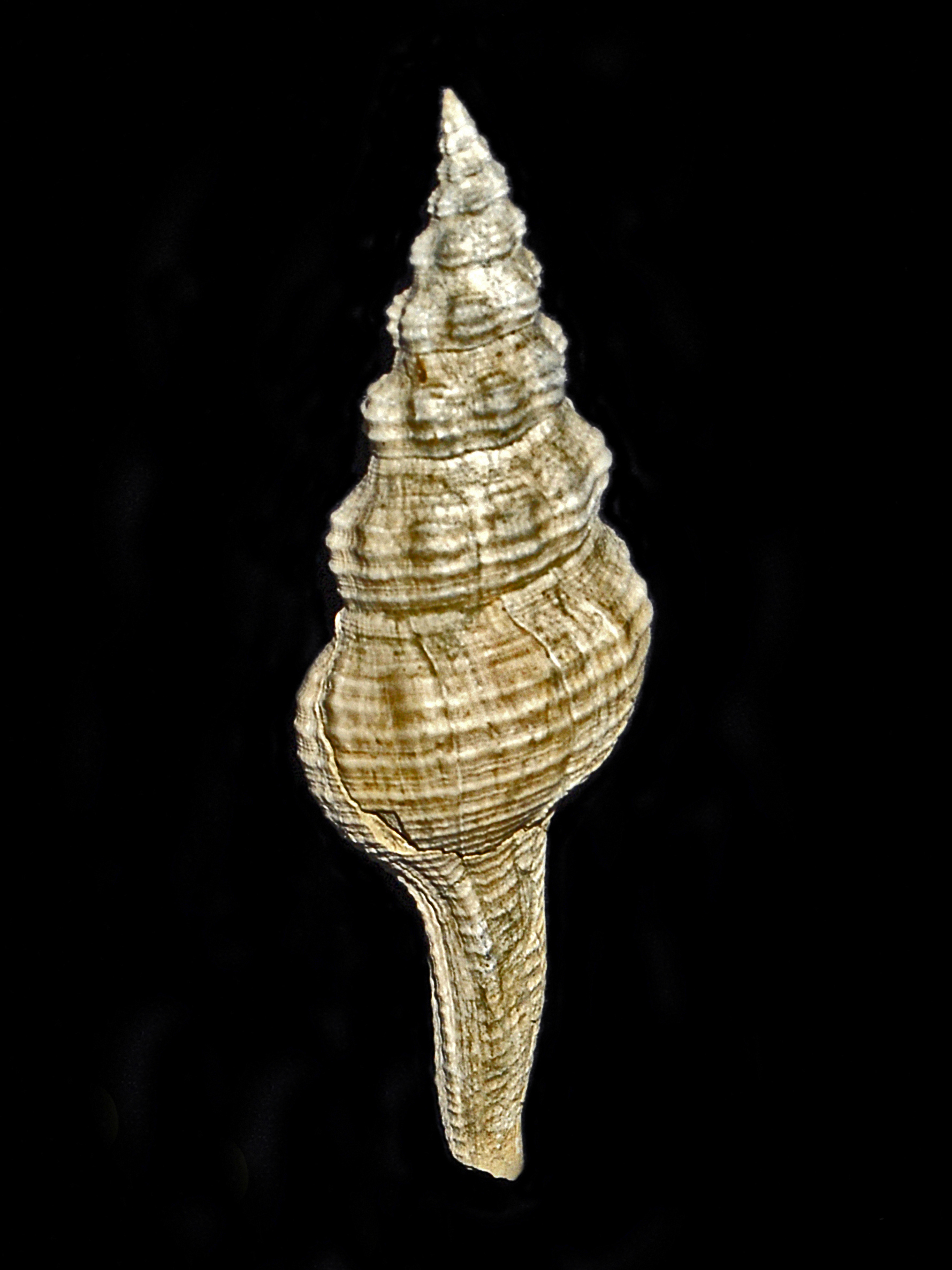
Fossil shell of Fusinus longiroster from Pliocene of Italy

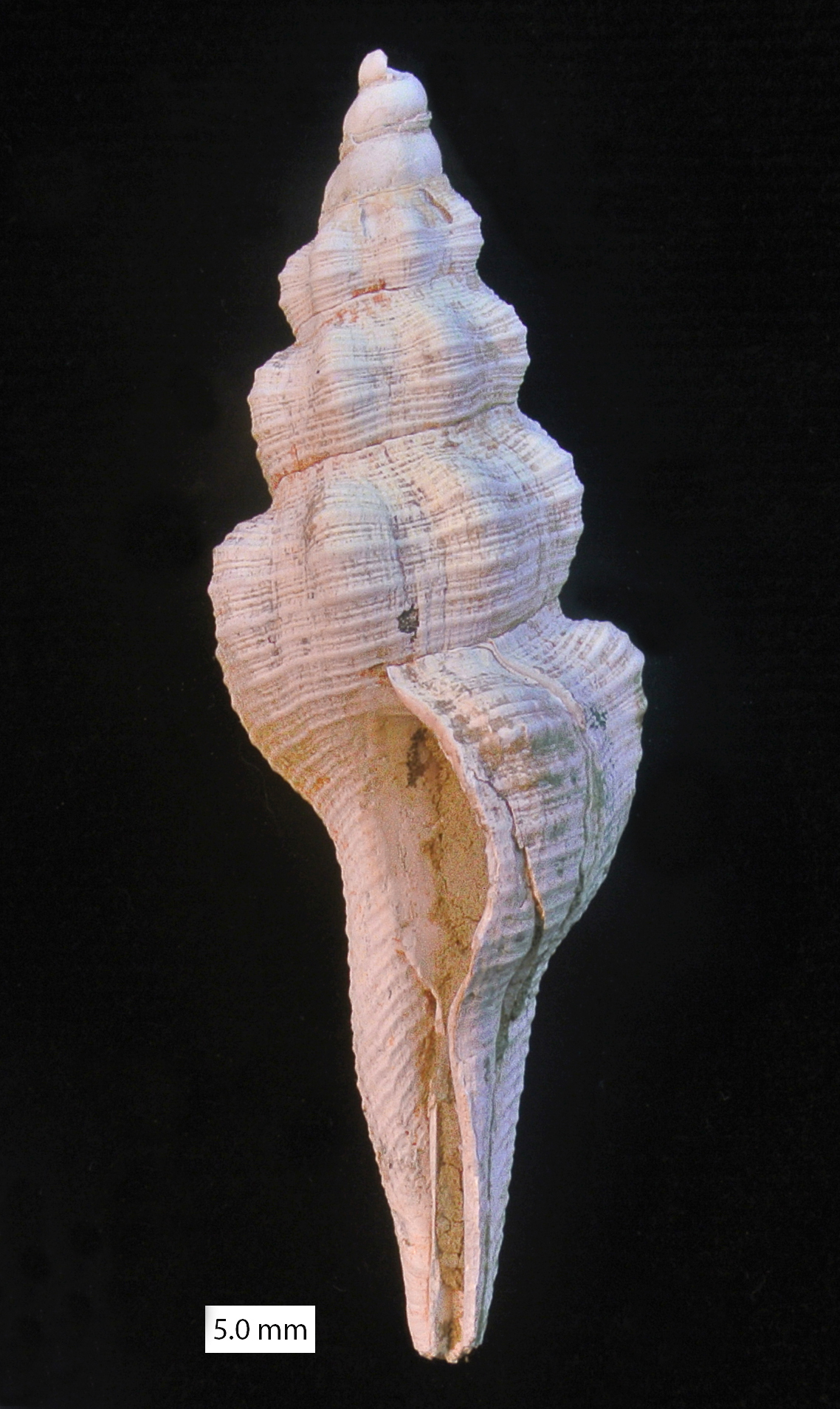
Fusinus sp. from the Pliocene of Cyprus.

Fusinus is a genus of small to large sea snails, marine gastropod molluscs in the family Fasciolariidae, the spindle snails and tulip snails.

== Fossil records ==
This genus is known in the fossil records from the Cretaceous to the Quaternary (age range: from 94.3 to 0.0 million years ago). Fossils are found in the marine strata all over the world.

== Species ==
Species in the genus Fusinus include:

According to the World Register of Marine Species (WoRMS) the following species with accepted names are included within the genus Fusinus

- Fusinus aepynotus (Dall, 1889) – graceful spindle
- Fusinus africanae (Barnard, 1959)
- Fusinus agadirensis Hadorn & Rolàn, 1999
- Fusinus agatha (Simone & Abbate, 2005)
- Fusinus albacarinoides Hadorn, Afonso & Rolán, 2009
- Fusinus albinus (Adams, 1856)
- Fusinus alcimus (Dall, 1889) – stout spindle
- Fusinus alcyoneum Hadorn & Fraussen, 2006
- Fusinus allyni McLean, 1970
- Fusinus alternatus Buzzurro & Russo, 2007
- Fusinus amadeus Callomon & Snyder, 2008
- Fusinus amphiurgus (Dall, 1889) – slender spindle
- Fusinus annae Snyder, 1986
- Fusinus arabicus (Melvill, 1898)
- Fusinus articulatus (G.B. Sowerby II, 1880)
- † Fusinus asper (J. Sowerby, 1821)
- Fusinus assimilis (Adams, 1856)
- Fusinus aurinodatus Stahlschmidt & Lyons, 2009
- Fusinus australis (Quoy & Gaimard, 1833)
- Fusinus azzurrae T. Cossignani, 2023
- Fusinus barclayi (G.B. Sowerby III, 1894)
- † Fusinus bensoni R. S. Allan, 1926
- Fusinus benthalis (Dall, 1889) – modest spindle
- Fusinus bifrons (Sturany, 1900)
- Fusinus blakensis Hadorn & Rogers, 2000
- Fusinus bocagei (P. Fischer, 1882)
  - Fusinus bocagei marcelpini Hadorn & Ryall, 1999
- Fusinus boettgeri (von Maltzan, 1884)
- Fusinus boucheti Hadorn & Ryall, 1999
- Fusinus brianoi Bozzetti, 2006
- Fusinus buzzurroi Prkic & Russo, 2008
- Fusinus chocolatus (Okutani, 1983)
- Fusinus chuni (Martens, 1904)
- Fusinus clarae Russo & Renda in Russo, 2013
- † Fusinus clavilithoides Landau, Harzhauser, Büyükmeriç & Breitenberger, 2016
- Fusinus colombiensis M. A. Snyder & N. C. Snyder, 1999
- Fusinus colus (Linnaeus, 1758)
- Fusinus consetti (Iredale, 1929)
- Fusinus corallinus Russo & Germanà, 2014
- Fusinus crassiplicatus Kira, 1954
- Fusinus cratis Kilburn, 1973
- Fusinus cretellai Buzzurro & Russo, 2008
- Fusinus damasoi Petuch & Berschauer, 2016
- Fusinus diandraensis Goodwin & Kosuge, 2008
- † Fusinus dictyotis (Tate, 1888)
- Fusinus dilectus (Adams, 1856)
- † Fusinus dilleri Hickman, 1980
- Fusinus diminutus Dall, 1915
- Fusinus dimitrii Buzzurro & Ovalis in Buzzurro & Russo, 2007
- Fusinus dovpeledi Snyder, 2002
- † Fusinus doylei (Stilwell & Zinsmeister, 1992)
- † Fusinus dyki (K. Martin, 1884)
- Fusinus emmae Callomon & Snyder, 2010
- † Fusinus eonodatus (Stilwell & Zinsmeister, 1992)
- Fusinus euekes Callomon & Snyder, 2017
- Fusinus ferrugineus (Kuroda & Habe, 1960)
- Fusinus fioritae Russo & Pagli, 2019
- Fusinus flammulatus Lussi & Stahlschmidt, 2007
- Fusinus flavicomus Hadorn & Fraussen, 2006
- Fusinus forceps (Perry, 1811)
  - Fusinus forceps salisburyi Fulton, 1930
- Fusinus frausseni Thach, 2018
- Fusinus gallagheri Smythe & Chatfield, 1981
- Fusinus gemmuliferus Kira, 1959
- † Fusinus gippslandicus (Tate, 1888)
- Fusinus gracillimus (Adams & Reeve, 1848)
- † Fusinus graciloaustralis Stilwell & Zinsmeister, 1992
- Fusinus guidonis Delsaerdt, 1995
- Fusinus halistreptus (Dall, 1889)
- Fusinus hartvigii (Shuttleworth, 1856)
- Fusinus harveyi Hadorn & Roger, 2000
- Fusinus hayesi Snyder, 1996
- † Fusinus henicus (Tate, 1889)
- Fusinus hernandezi Hadorn & Rolán, 2009
- Fusinus humboldti Poorman, 1981
- † Fusinus ickeae (K. Martin, 1931)
- † Fusinus incilifer (K. Martin, 1931)
- Fusinus inglorius Hadorn & Fraussen, 2006
- Fusinus insularis Russo & Calascibetta, 2018
- Fusinus jasminae Hadorn, 1966
- Fusinus juliabrownae Callomon, Snyder & Noseworthy, 2009
- Fusinus labronicus (Monterosato, 1884)
- Fusinus laetus (G.B. Sowerby II, 1880)
- Fusinus laticlavius Callomon & Snyder, 2017
- Fusinus laviniae Snyder & Hadorn, 2006
- Fusinus lightbourni M.A. Snyder, 1984
- Fusinus longissimus (Gmelin, 1791)
- Fusinus magnapex Poorman, 1981
- Fusinus malhaensis Hadorn, Fraussen & Bondarev, 2001
- Fusinus marcusi Hadorn & Rogers, 2000
- Fusinus mariaodetae Petuch & Berschauer, 2016
- Fusinus marisinicus Callomon & Snyder, 2009
- Fusinus maritzaallaryae Cossignani & Allary, 2019
- Fusinus maroccensis (Gmelin, 1791)
- † Fusinus menengtenganus (K. Martin, 1895)
- † Fusinus meredithae (Tenison Woods, 1876)
- Fusinus meteoris Gofas, 2000
- Fusinus midwayensis Kosuge, 1979
- Fusinus multicarinatus (Lamarck, 1822)
- † Fusinus nanggulanensis (K. Martin, 1914)
- Fusinus nobilis Reeve, 1847
- Fusinus nodosoplicatus (Dunker, 1867)
- Fusinus palmarium Hadorn & Fraussen, 2006
- Fusinus parvulus (Monterosato, 1884)
- Fusinus pauciliratus (Shuto, 1962)
  - Fusinus pauciliratus complex Snyder, 2000
- Fusinus paulus Poorman, 1981
- Fusinus penioniformis Habe, 1970
- Fusinus percyanus (G. B. Sowerby II, 1880)
- Fusinus perplexus (Adams, 1864)
- Fusinus pulchellus (Philippi, 1844)
- Fusinus raricostatus (Del Prete, 1883)
- Fusinus rogersi Hadorn, 1999
- † Fusinus rudis (R. A. Philippi, 1844)
  - Fusinus rudis var. parvulus Monterosato, 1884
- † Fusinus rugosus (Briart & Cornet, 1868)
- Fusinus rushii (Dall, 1889)
- Fusinus salisburyi Fulton, 1930
- Fusinus sandvichensis (G. B. Sowerby II, 1880)
- Fusinus saundersi Hadorn & Rolán, 2009
- Fusinus schrammi (Crosse, 1865)
- † Fusinus sculptilis (Tate, 1888)
- Fusinus sectus (Locard, 1897)
- Fusinus seriatus Callomon & Snyder, 2017
- Fusinus severnsi Goodwin & Kosuge, 2008
- Fusinus somaliensis Smythe & Chatfield, 1984
- Fusinus sonorae Poorman, 1981
- † Fusinus staadti Le Renard, 1994
- Fusinus stannum Callomon & Snyder, 2008
- Fusinus stanyi Swinnen & Fraussen, 2006
- † Fusinus suraknisos Stilwell & Zinsmeister, 1992
- † Fusinus tangituensis (Marwick, 1926)
- Fusinus tenerifensis Hadorn & Rolán, 1999
- Fusinus teretron Callomon & Snyder, 2008
- Fusinus thermariensis Hadorn & Fraussen, 2006
- Fusinus thielei (Schepman, 1911)
- Fusinus thompsoni Hadorn & Rogers, 2000
- † Fusinus timorensis (K. Martin, 1884)
- Fusinus toreuma (Deshayes, 1843)
- Fusinus townsendi (Melvill, 1899)
- Fusinus transkeiensis Hadorn, 2000
- † Fusinus trivialis (Tate, 1899)
- † Fusinus ucalis H. E. Vokes, 1939
- † Fusinus vitreoides (R. M. Johnston, 1880)
- Fusinus ventimigliae Russo & Renda in Russo, 2013
- Fusinus vitreus Dall, 1927
- † Fusinus waihaoicus Laws, 1935
- Fusinus wallacei Hadorn & Fraussen, 2006
- † Fusinus watermani (M. Smith, 1936)
- Fusinus zacae Strong & Hertlein, 1937
- Fusinus zebrinus (Odhner, 1923)

Species brought into synonymy

- Subgenus Fusinus (Barbarofusus) Grabau & Shimer, 1909 accepted as Fusinus Rafinesque, 1815
- Subgenus Fusinus (Chryseofusus) Hadorn & Fraussen, 2003 accepted as Chryseofusus Hadorn & Fraussen, 2003
- Subgenus Fusinus (Sinistralia) H. Adams & A. Adams, 1853 accepted as Fusinus Rafinesque, 1815
- Fusinus acherusius Hadorn & Fraussen, 2003 : synonym of Chryseofusus acherusius (Hadorn & Fraussen, 2003)
- Fusinus akitai Kuroda & Habe, 1961: synonym of Marmorofusus akitai (Kuroda & Habe, 1961) (original combination)
- Fusinus alisae Hdorn & Fraussen, 2003 : synonym of Chryseofusus alisae
- Fusinus alisonae Hadorn, Snyder & Fraussen, 2008: synonym of Chryseofusus alisonae (Hadorn, Snyder & Fraussen, 2008)
- Fusinus ambustus (Gould, 1853): synonym of Hesperaptyxis ambustus (Gould, 1853)
- Fusinus amiantus :synonym of Amiantofusus amiantus
- Fusinus angeli Russo & Angelidis, 2016 : synonym of Aegeofusinus angeli (Russo & Angelidis, 2016) (original combination)
- Fusinus anguliplicatus Kuroda, 1949: synonym of Fusinus teretron Callomon & Snyder, 2008
- Fusinus ansatus (Gmelin, 1791): synonym of Lyonsifusus ansatus (Gmelin, 1791)
- Fusinus artutus Hadorn & Fraussen, 2003 : synonym of Chryseofusus artutus
- †Fusinus barbarensis (Trask, 1855) – Santa Barbara spindle: synonym of †Barbarofusus barbarensis (Trask, 1855) †
- Fusinus beckii (Reeve, 1848): synonym of Enigmofusus beckii (Reeve, 1848)
- Fusinus benjamini Hadorn & Rolàn, 1997: synonym of Aristofusus benjamini (Hadorn, 1997) (original combination)
- Fusinus bishopi Petuch & Berschauer, 2017: synonym of Marmorofusus bishopi (Petuch & Berschauer, 2017) (original combination)
- Fusinus bonaespei (Barnard, 1959): synonym of Chryseofusus bonaespei (Barnard, 1959)
- Fusinus bountyi Rehder & Wilson, 1975: synonym of Cyrtulus bountyi (Rehder & B. R. Wilson, 1975) (original combination)
- Fusinus bradneri (Drivas & Jay, 1990) : synonym of Chryseofusus bradneri
- Fusinus braziliensis (Grabau, 1904): synonym of Goniofusus brasiliensis (Grabau, 1904)
- Fusinus breviplicatus Kuroda, 1948: synonym of Fusinus teretron Callomon & Snyder, 2008
- Fusinus buxeus (Reeve, 1847); synonym of Viridifusus buxeus (Reeve, 1847)
- Fusinus cadus Hadorn & Fraussen, 2003 : synonym of Chryseofusus cadus
- Fusinus caparti Adam & Knudsen, 1950: synonym of Apertifusus caparti (Adam & Knudsen, 1955)
- Fusinus carvalhoriosi Mascotay & Campos, 2001: synonym of Lyonsifusus carvalhoriosi (Macsotay & Campos, 2001)
- Fusinus ceramidus (Dall, 1889): synonym of Lamellilatirus ceramidus (Dall, 1889)
- Fusinus chrysodomoides (Schepman, 1911) : synonym of Chryseofusus chrysodomoides
- Fusinus cinereus (Reeve, 1847): synonym of Hesperaptyxis cinereus (Reeve, 1847)
- Fusinus colpoicus (Dall, 1909): synonym of Araiofusus colpoicus (Dall, 1915)
- Fusinus coltrorum Hadorn & Rogers, 2000: synonym of Heilprinia coltrorum (Hadorn & Rogers, 2000)
- Fusinus couei (Petit de la Saussaye, 1853) – Yucatán spindle: synonym of Aristofusus couei (Petit de la Saussaye, 1853)
- Fusinus dampieri Finlay, 1930: synonym of Marmorofusus philippii (Jonas, 1846)
- Fusinus dapsilis Hadorn & Fraussen, 2003 : synonym of Chryseofusus dapsilis
- Fusinus dimassai Buzzurro & Russo, 2007: synonym of Pseudofusus dimassai (Buzzurro & Russo, 2007) (superseded combination)
- Fusinus dowianus Olsson, 1954: synonym of Heilprinia dowiana (Olsson, 1954) (original combination)
- Fusinus dupetitthouarsi (Kiener, 1840): synonym of Goniofusus dupetitthouarsi (Kiener, 1840)
- Fusinus edjanssi Callomon & Snyder, 2017: synonym of Callifusus edjanssi (Callomon & Snyder, 2017)
- Fusinus eucosmius (Dall, 1889) – apricot spindle : synonym of Fusinus excavatus (Sowerby II, 1880)
- Fusinus eviae Buzzurro & Russo, 2007: synonym of Aegeofusinus eviae (Buzzurro & Russo, 2007) (original combination)
- Fusinus excavatus (Sowerby II, 1880): synonym of Aristofusus excavatus (G. B. Sowerby II, 1880) (original combination)
- Fusinus faurei (Barnard, 1959): synonym of Granulifusus faurei (Barnard, 1959)
- Fusinus felipensis (Lowe, 1935): synonym of Hesperaptyxis felipensis (H. N. Lowe, 1935) (original combination)
- Fusinus filosus (Schubert & Wagner, 1829): synonym of Polygona filosa (Schubert & J. A. Wagner, 1829)
- Fusinus frailensis Mascotay & Campos, 2001: synonym of Lyonsifusus ansatus (Gmelin, 1791)
- Fusinus fredbakeri Lowe, 1935: synonym of Hesperaptyxis fredbakeri (H. N. Lowe, 1935) (original combination)
- Fusinus frenguellii (Carcelles, 1953): synonym of Apertifusus frenguellii (Carcelles, 1953)
- Fusinus galatheae Powell, 1967: synonym of Cyrtulus galatheae (Powell, 1967) (original combination)
  - Fusinus galatheae bountyi Rehder & Wilson, 1975: synonym of Cyrtulus bountyi (Rehder & B. R. Wilson, 1975)
- Fusinus genticus (Iredale, 1936): synonym of Cyrtulus genticus (Iredale, 1936)
- Fusinus harfordii (Stearns, 1871): synonym of Harfordia harfordii (Stearns, 1871)
- Fusinus helenae Bartsch, 1939 – brown spindle: synonym of Aristofusus helenae (Bartsch, 1939) (original combination)
- Fusinus hyphalus M. Smith, 1940 : synonym of Chryseofusus hyphalus
- Fusinus grabaui Kuroda & Habe, 1952 : synonym of Fusinus nodosoplicatus
- Fusinus graciliformis (G.B. Sowerby II, 1880) : synonym of Chryseofusus graciliformis
- Fusinus indicus (Anton, 1838): synonym of Marmorofusus tuberculatus (Lamarck, 1822)
- Fusinus irregularis (Grabau, 1904): synonym of Callifusus irregularis (Grabau, 1904)
- Fusinus josei Hadorn & Rogers, 2000: synonym of Apertifusus josei (Hadorn & Rogers, 2000) (original combination)
- Fusinus jurgeni Hadorn & Fraussen, 2002 : synonym of Chryseofusus jurgeni
- Fusinus kazdailisi Fraussen & Hadorn, 2000 : synonym of Chryseofusus kazdailisi
- Fusinus kilburni Hadorn, 1999: synonym of Cyrtulus kilburni (Hadorn, 1999) (original combination)
- Fusinus kobelti (Dall, 1877): synonym of Barbarofusus kobelti (Dall, 1877)
- Fusinus laticostatus (Deshayes, 1831): synonym of Marmorofusus undulatus (Gmelin, 1791)
- Fusinus leptorhynchus (Tapparone-Canefri, 1875): synonym of Marmorofusus leptorhynchus (Tapperoni Canefri, 1875)
- Fusinus luteopictus (Dall, 1877): synonym of Hesperaptyxis luteopictus (Dall, 1877)
- Fusinus margaritae Buzzurro & Russo, 2007: synonym of Aegeofusinus margaritae (Buzzurro & Russo, 2007)
- Fusinus martinezi Macsotay & Campos, 2001: synonym of Lyonsifusus ansatus (Gmelin, 1791)
- Fusinus mauiensis Callomon & Snyder, 2006: synonym of Cyrtulus mauiensis (Callomon & Snyder, 2006)
- Fusinus meyeri (Dunker, 1869): synonym of Apertifusus meyeri (Dunker, 1869)
- Fusinus michaelrogersi Goodwin, 2001: synonym of Marmorofusus michaelrogersi (Goodwin, 2001)
- Fusinus monksae Dall, 1915 : synonym of Fusinus robustus (Trask, 1855)
- Fusinus nicki Snyder, 2002: synonym of Enigmofusus nicki (Snyder, 2002)
- Fusinus nicobaricus (Röding, 1798): synonym of Marmorofusus nicobaricus (Röding, 1798)
- Fusinus nigrirostratus (E. A. Smith, 1879): synonym of Marmorofusus nigrirostratus (E. A. Smith, 1879)
- Fusinus novaehollandiae (Reeve, 1846): synonym of Propefusus novaehollandiae (Reeve, 1848)
- Fusinus oblitus (Reeve, 1847): synonym of Marmorofusus oblitus (Reeve, 1847)
- Fusinus ocelliferus (Lamarck, 1816): synonym of Africofusus ocelliferus (Lamarck, 1816)
- Fusinus panamensis Dall, 1908 : synonym of Fusinus spectrum
- Fusinus patriciae Russo & Olivieri in Russo, 2013: synonym of Aegeofusinus patriciae (Russo & Olivieri, 2013)
- Fusinus pearsoni Snyder, 2002 : synonym of Fusolatirus pearsoni (Snyder, 2002)
- Fusinus polygonoides (Lamarck, 1822): synonym of Marmorofusus polygonoides (Lamarck, 1822)
- Fusinus profetai Nofroni, 1982: synonym of Aegeofusinus profetai (Nofroni, 1982)
- Fusinus pyrulatus (Reeve, 1847): synonym of Propefusus undulatus (Perry, 1811)
- Fusinus retiarius (Martens, 1901): synonym of Vermeijius retiarius (E. von Martens, 1901)
- Fusinus riscus Hdorn & Fraussen, 2003 : synonym of Chryseofusus riscus
- Fusinus robustus (Trask, 1855): synonym of Harfordia robusta (Trask, 1855)
- Fusinus rolani Buzzurro & Ovalis, 2005: synonym of Aegeofusinus rolani (Buzzurro & Ovalis, 2005)
- Fusinus rostratus (Olivi, 1792): synonym of Pseudofusus rostratus (Olivi, 1792)
- Fusinus rusticulus (Monterosato, 1880): synonym of Pseudofusus rusticulus (Monterosato, 1880)
- Fusinus rutilus Nicolay & Berthelot, 1996: synonym of Ariefusus rutilus (Nicolay & Berthelot, 1996)
- Fusinus sanctaeluciae : redirected to Fusinus rostratus
- Fusinus satsumaensis Hadorn & Chino, 2005 : synonym of Chryseofusus satsumaensis
- Fusinus scissus Hadorn & Fraussen, 2003 : synonym of Chryseofusus scissus
- Fusinus similis (Baird, 1873): synonym of Cyrtulus similis (Baird, 1873)
- Fusinus spectrum (A. Adams & Reeve, 1848): synonym of Goniofusus spectrum (A. Adams & Reeve, 1848)
- Fusinus stegeri Lyons, 1978 – ornamented spindle: synonym of Aristofusus stegeri (Lyons, 1978)
- Fusinus strigatus (Philippi, 1850): synonym of Goniofusus strigatus (Philippi, 1850)
- Fusinus subangulatus (von Martens, 1901) : synonym of Chryseofusus subangulatus
- Fusinus suturalis Nordsieck, 1972: synonym of Fusinus parvulus (Monterosato, 1884)
- Fusinus syracusanus (Linnaeus, 1758): synonym of Aptyxis syracusana (Linnaeus, 1758)
  - Fusinus syracusanus var. rissoianus Locard, 1892: synonym of Aptyxis syracusana (Linnaeus, 1758)
  - Fusinus syracusanus var. rubra Scacchi, 1836: synonym of Aptyxis syracusana (Linnaeus, 1758)
  - Fusinus syracusanus var. umbilicata Coen, 1922: synonym of Aptyxis syracusana (Linnaeus, 1758)
- Fusinus tessellatus (G.B. Sowerby II, 1880): synonym of Marmorofusus philippii (Jonas, 1846)
- Fusinus timessus (Dall, 1889): synonym of Heilprinia timessa (Dall, 1889)
- Fusinus toreuma: synonym of Fusinus colus
- Fusinus tuberculatus (Lamarck, 1822): synonym of Marmorofusus tuberculatus (Lamarck, 1822)
- Fusinus tuberosus (Reeve, 1847): synonym of Marmorofusus tuberosus (Reeve, 1847)
- Fusinus turris (Valenciennes, 1832): synonym of Goniofusus turris (Valenciennes, 1832)
- Fusinus undatus (Gmelin, 1791): synonym of Cyrtulus undatus (Gmelin, 1791)
- Fusinus undulatus (Gmelin, 1791): synonym of Marmorofusus undulatus (Gmelin, 1791)
- Fusinus valdiviae Hadorn & Fraussen, 1999 : synonym of Chryseofusus graciliformis
- Fusinus verbinneni Snyder, 2006: synonym of Marmorofusus verbinneni (Snyder, 2006)
- Fusinus vercoi Snyder, 2004: synonym of Marmorofusus vercoi (Snyder, 2004)
- Fusinus verrucosus (Gmelin, 1791): synonym of Marmorofusus verrucosus (Gmelin, 1791)
- Fusinus virginiae Hadorn & Fraussen, 2002: synonym of Vermeijius virginiae (Hadorn & Fraussen, 2002)
- Fusinus wareni Hadorn & Fraussen, 2003 : synonym of Chryseofusus scissus
- Fusinus wellsi Snyder, 2004: synonym of Marmorofusus wellsi (Snyder, 2004)
- Fusinus westralis Hadorn & Fraussen, 2003 : synonym of Chryseofusus westralis
- Fusinus williami Poppe & Tagaro, 2006: synonym of Granulifusus williami (Poppe & Tagaro, 2006)
