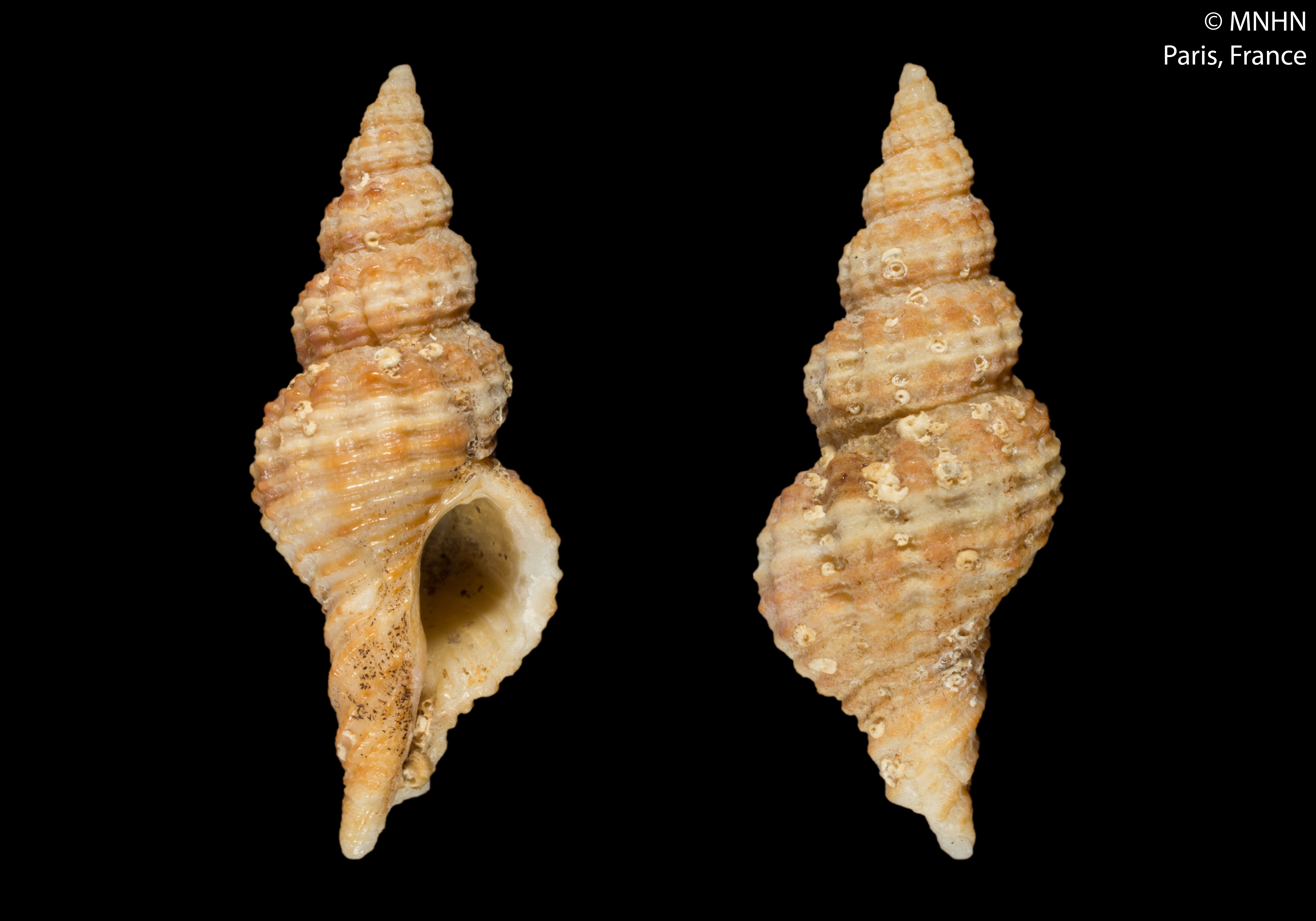

Scientific classification
- Kingdom: Animalia
- Phylum: Mollusca
- Class: Gastropoda
- Subclass: Caenogastropoda
- Order: Neogastropoda
- Family: Fasciolariidae
- Genus: Fusinus
- Species: F. cretellai

Binomial name
- Fusinus cretellai Buzzurro & Russo, 2008

Synonyms
- Fusinus crassus (Pallary, 1901) (preoccupied name); Fusus crassus Pallary, 1902; Fusus crassus var. minor Pallary, 1920

= Fusinus cretellai =

Species of gastropod

Fusinus cretellai is a species of sea snail, a marine gastropod mollusc in the family Fasciolariidae, the spindle snails, the tulip snails and their allies.

== Description ==
The length of the shell attains 27.8 mm.

== Distribution ==
This marine species occurs off Tanger.
