= Fusinus arabicus =

Scientific classification
- Kingdom: Animalia
- Phylum: Mollusca
- Class: Gastropoda
- Subclass: Caenogastropoda
- Order: Neogastropoda
- Family: Fasciolariidae
- Genus: Fusinus
- Species: F. arabicus

Binomial name
- Fusinus arabicus (Melvill, 1898)

Synonyms
- Fusus arabicus Melvill, 1898

Species of gastropod

Fusinus arabicus is a species of sea snail, a marine gastropod mollusk in the family Fasciolariidae, the spindle snails, the tulip snails and their allies.
