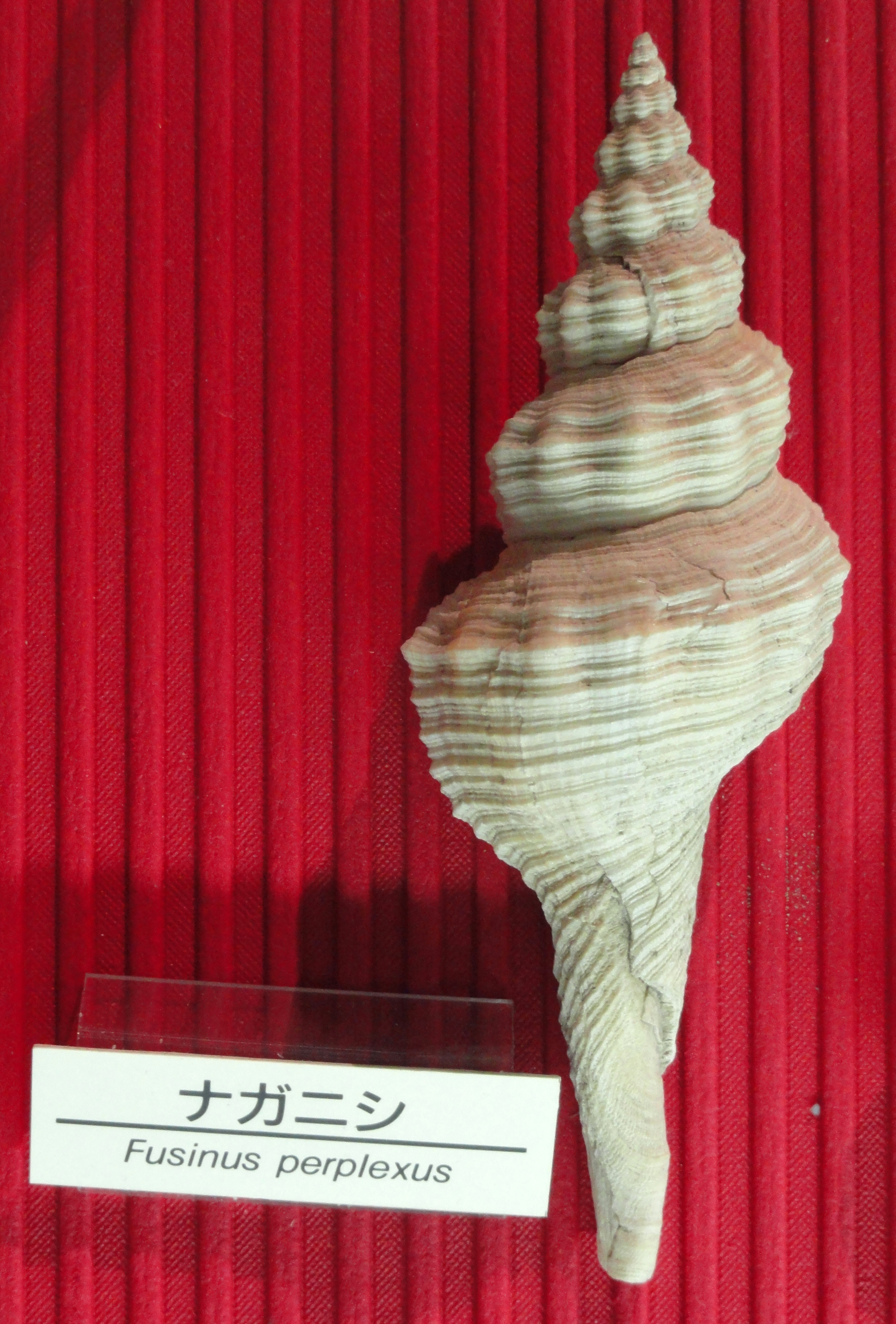

Scientific classification
- Kingdom: Animalia
- Phylum: Mollusca
- Class: Gastropoda
- Subclass: Caenogastropoda
- Order: Neogastropoda
- Family: Fasciolariidae
- Genus: Fusinus
- Species: F. perplexus

Binomial name
- Fusinus perplexus (Adams, 1864)

Synonyms
- Fusus perplexus Adams, 1864

= Fusinus perplexus =

Species of gastropod

Fusinus perplexus is a species of sea snail, a marine gastropod mollusc in the family Fasciolariidae, the spindle snails, the tulip snails and their allies.
