= Fusinus teretron =

Scientific classification
- Kingdom: Animalia
- Phylum: Mollusca
- Class: Gastropoda
- Subclass: Caenogastropoda
- Order: Neogastropoda
- Family: Fasciolariidae
- Genus: Fusinus
- Species: F. teretron

Binomial name
- Fusinus teretron Callomon & Snyder, 2008

Synonyms
- Fusinus anguliplicatus Kuroda, 1949 (not published in the sense of the Code); Fusinus breviplicatus Kuroda, 1948 (not published in the sense of the Code)

Species of gastropod

Fusinus teretron is a species of sea snail, a marine gastropod mollusc in the family Fasciolariidae, the spindle snails, the tulip snails and their allies.

== Distribution ==
This marine species occurs off Japan.
