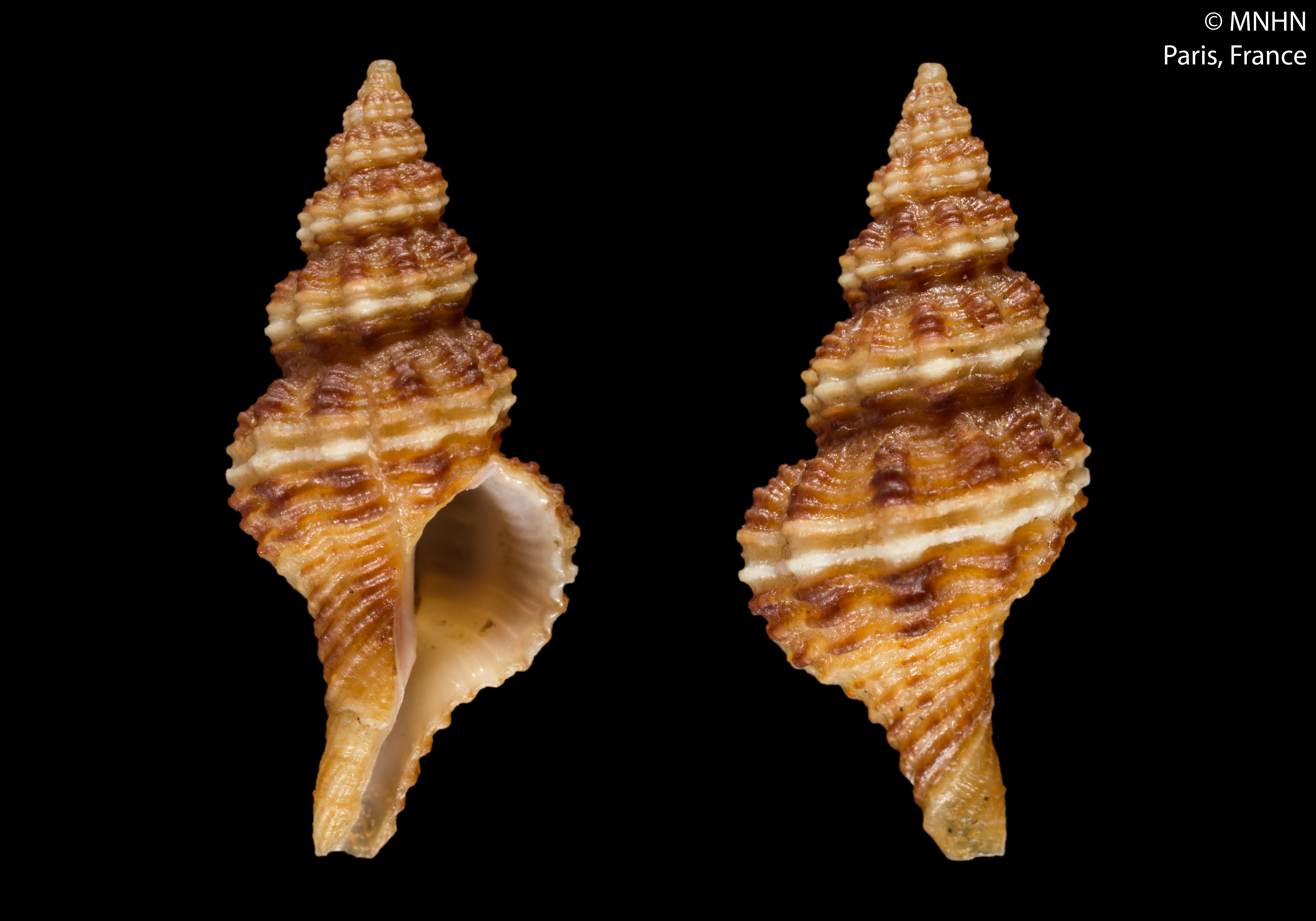

Scientific classification
- Kingdom: Animalia
- Phylum: Mollusca
- Class: Gastropoda
- Subclass: Caenogastropoda
- Order: Neogastropoda
- Family: Fasciolariidae
- Genus: Fusinus
- Species: F. albacarinoides

Binomial name
- Fusinus albacarinoides Hadorn, Afonso & Rolan, 2009

= Fusinus albacarinoides =

Species of gastropod

Fusinus albacarinoides is a species of sea snail, a marine gastropod mollusc in the family Fasciolariidae, the spindle snails, the tulip snails and their allies.

== Description ==
This species is a small gastropod with a slender, elongate shell reaching up to 18.5 mm in length. The original description noted that the shell is colored red-brown to dark brown with a conspicuous peripheral white band, giving a distinct contrast along the whorls. The surface sculpture is rough and sculptured with axial ribs and spiral, cords, typical of many spindle snails, but comparatively smaller and more delicate than in larger congeners. The spire is slender and tapering, and the siphonal canal is relatively short, a feature that helps distinguish this species from other eastern Atlantic and Mediterranean members of its genus. The protoconch is paucispiral, suggesting limited larval dispersal and potential localized distribution. These morphological traits are consistent with small benthic fusinines adapted to rocky substrates in shallow subtidal zones.

== Distribution ==
This species was found in the Gulf of Cadiz, off Portugal.
