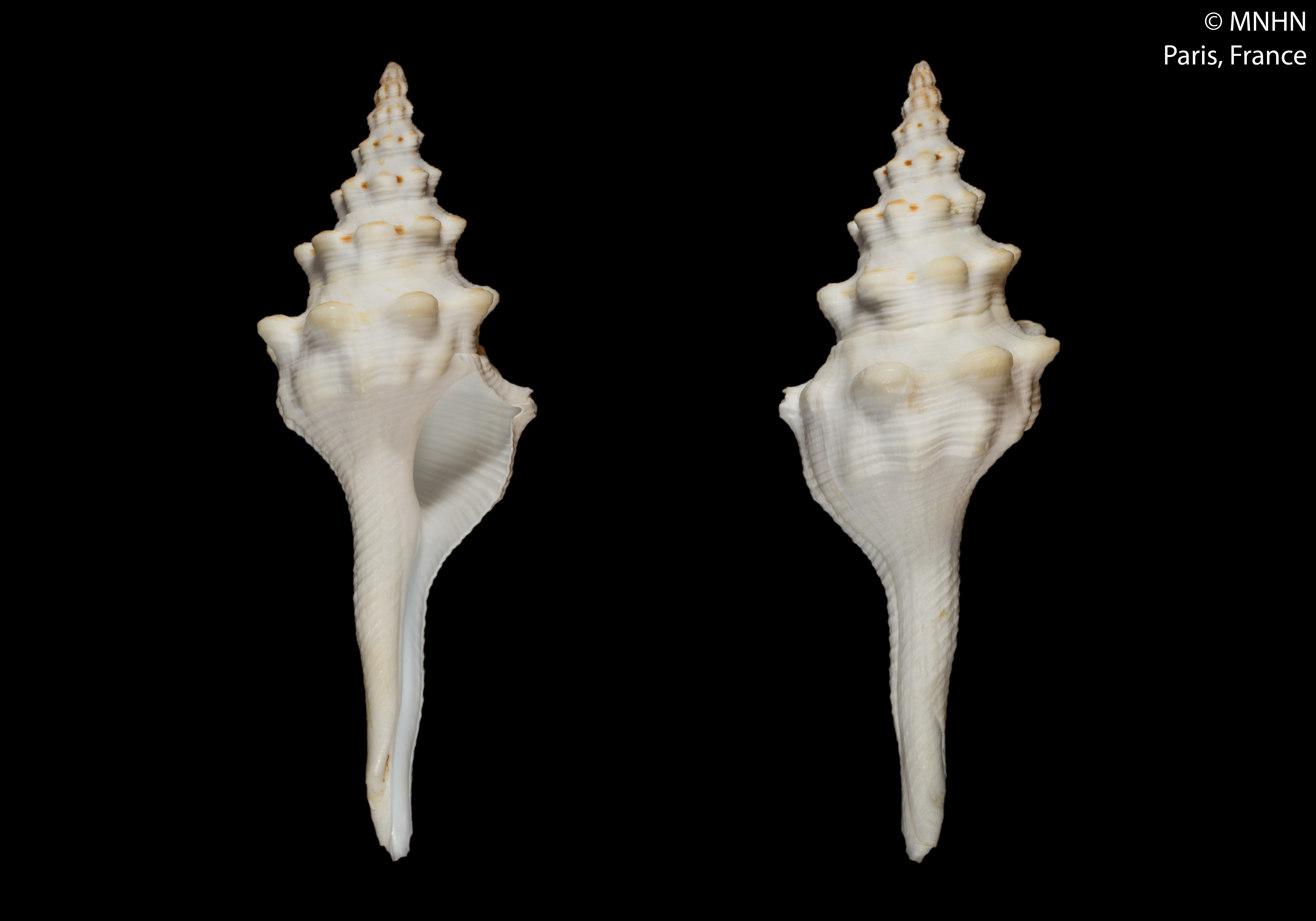

Scientific classification
- Kingdom: Animalia
- Phylum: Mollusca
- Class: Gastropoda
- Subclass: Caenogastropoda
- Order: Neogastropoda
- Family: Fasciolariidae
- Genus: Fusinus
- Species: F. aurinodatus

Binomial name
- Fusinus aurinodatus Stahlschmidt & Lyons, 2009

= Fusinus aurinodatus =

Species of gastropod

Fusinus aurinodatus is a species of sea snail, a marine gastropod mollusc in the family Fasciolariidae, the spindle snails, the tulip snails and their allies.

== Description ==
The length of the shell attains 161.2 mm.

== Distribution ==
This marine species occurs off Madagascar.
