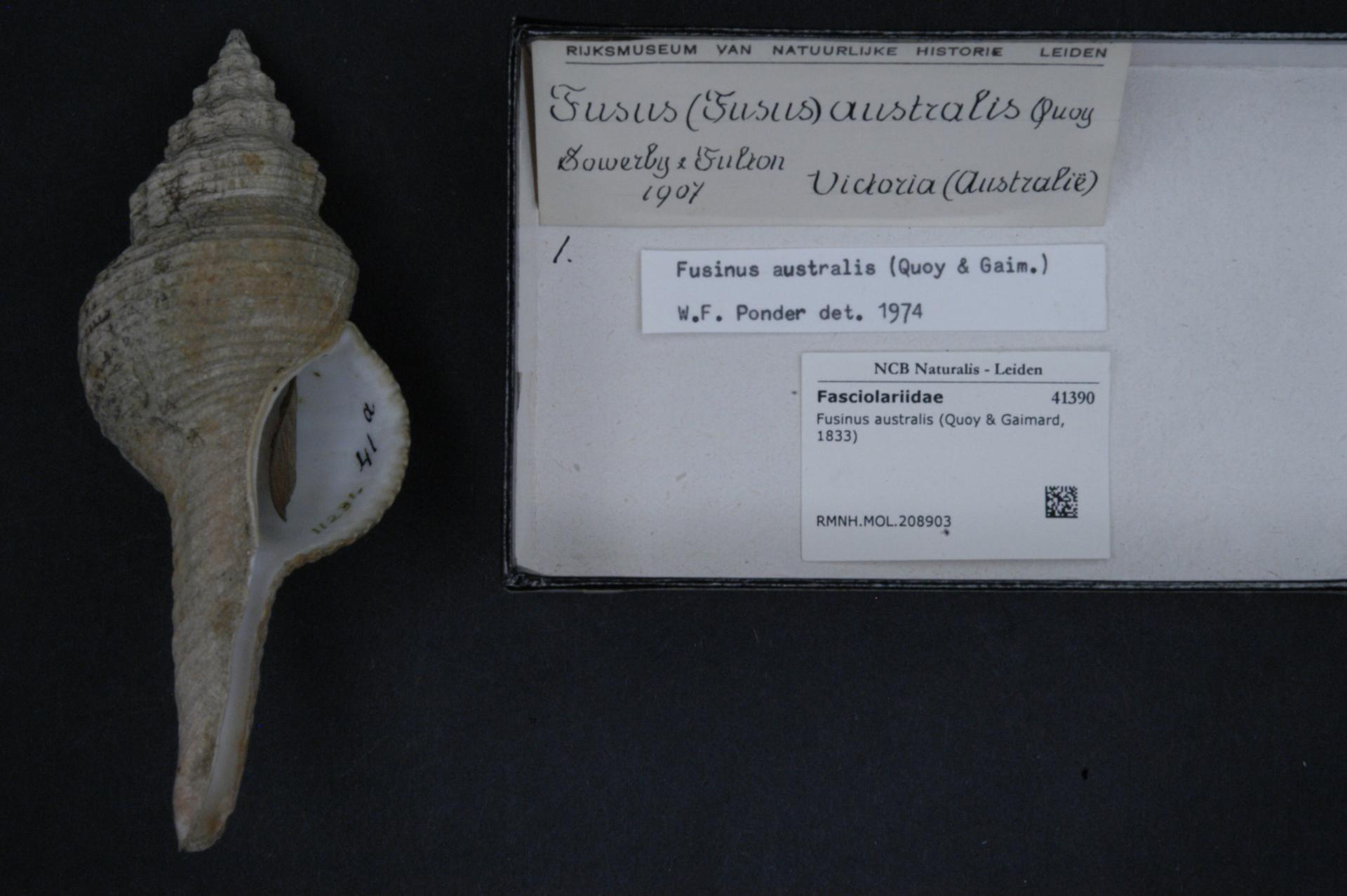

Scientific classification
- Kingdom: Animalia
- Phylum: Mollusca
- Class: Gastropoda
- Subclass: Caenogastropoda
- Order: Neogastropoda
- Family: Fasciolariidae
- Genus: Fusinus
- Species: F. australis

Binomial name
- Fusinus australis (Quoy & Gaimard, 1833)

Synonyms
- Fusus australis Quoy & Gazimard, 1833

= Fusinus australis =

Species of gastropod

Fusinus australis is a species of sea snail, a marine gastropod mollusk in the family Fasciolariidae, the spindle snails, the tulip snails and their allies.
