= Fusinus rushii =

Scientific classification
- Kingdom: Animalia
- Phylum: Mollusca
- Class: Gastropoda
- Subclass: Caenogastropoda
- Order: Neogastropoda
- Family: Fasciolariidae
- Genus: Fusinus
- Species: F. rushii

Binomial name
- Fusinus rushii (Dall, 1889)

Synonyms
- Fusus alcimus rushii Dall, 1889

Species of gastropod

Fusinus rushii is a species of sea snail, a marine gastropod mollusc in the family Fasciolariidae, the spindle snails, the tulip snails and their allies.
