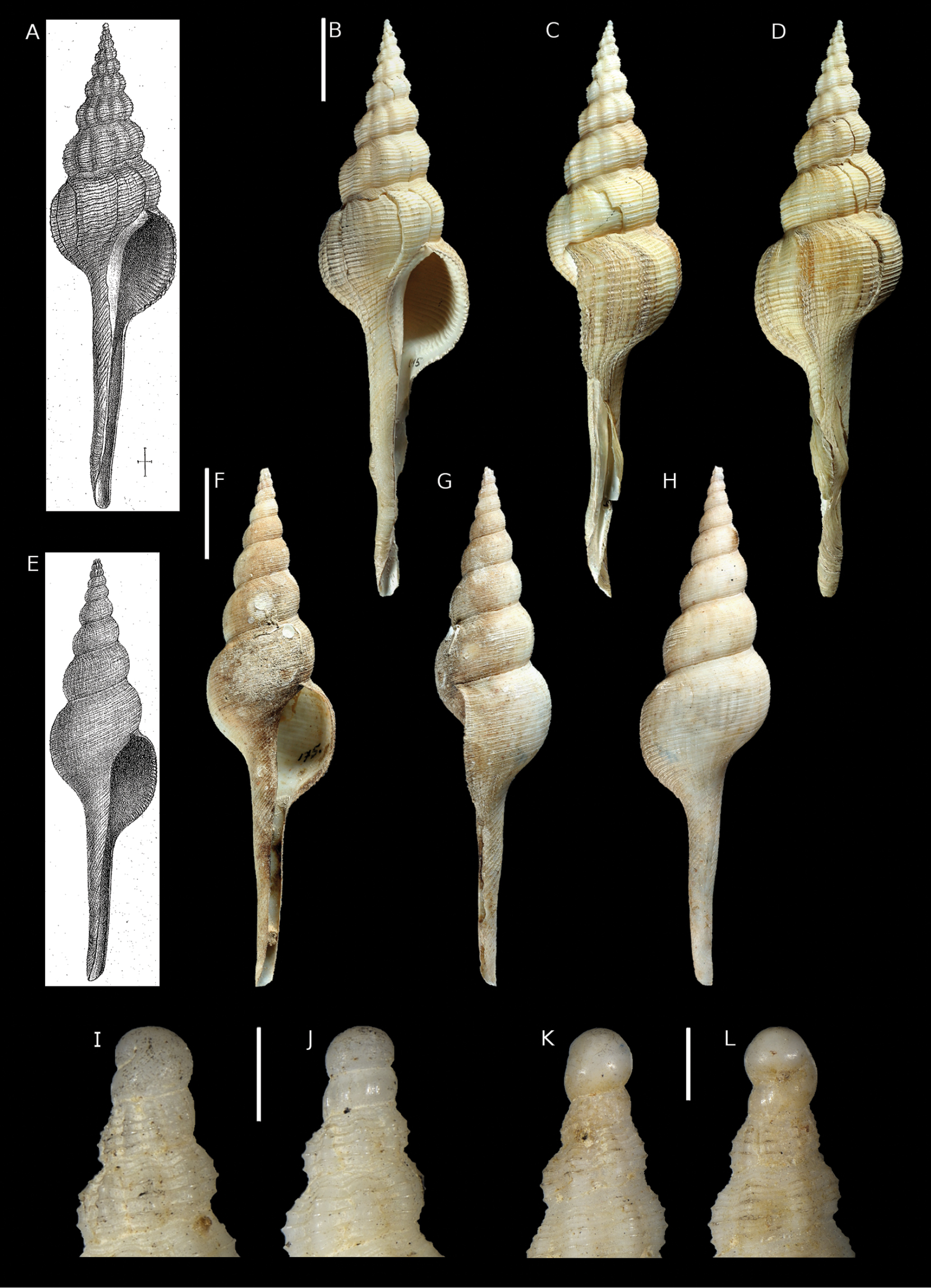

Scientific classification
- Kingdom: Animalia
- Phylum: Mollusca
- Class: Gastropoda
- Subclass: Caenogastropoda
- Order: Neogastropoda
- Family: Fasciolariidae
- Genus: Fusinus
- Species: F. bifrons

Binomial name
- Fusinus bifrons (Sturany, 1900)

Synonyms
- Fusus bifrons Sturany, 1900

= Fusinus bifrons =

Species of gastropod

Fusinus bifrons is a species of sea snail, a marine gastropod mollusk in the family Fasciolariidae, the spindle snails, the tulip snails and their allies.
