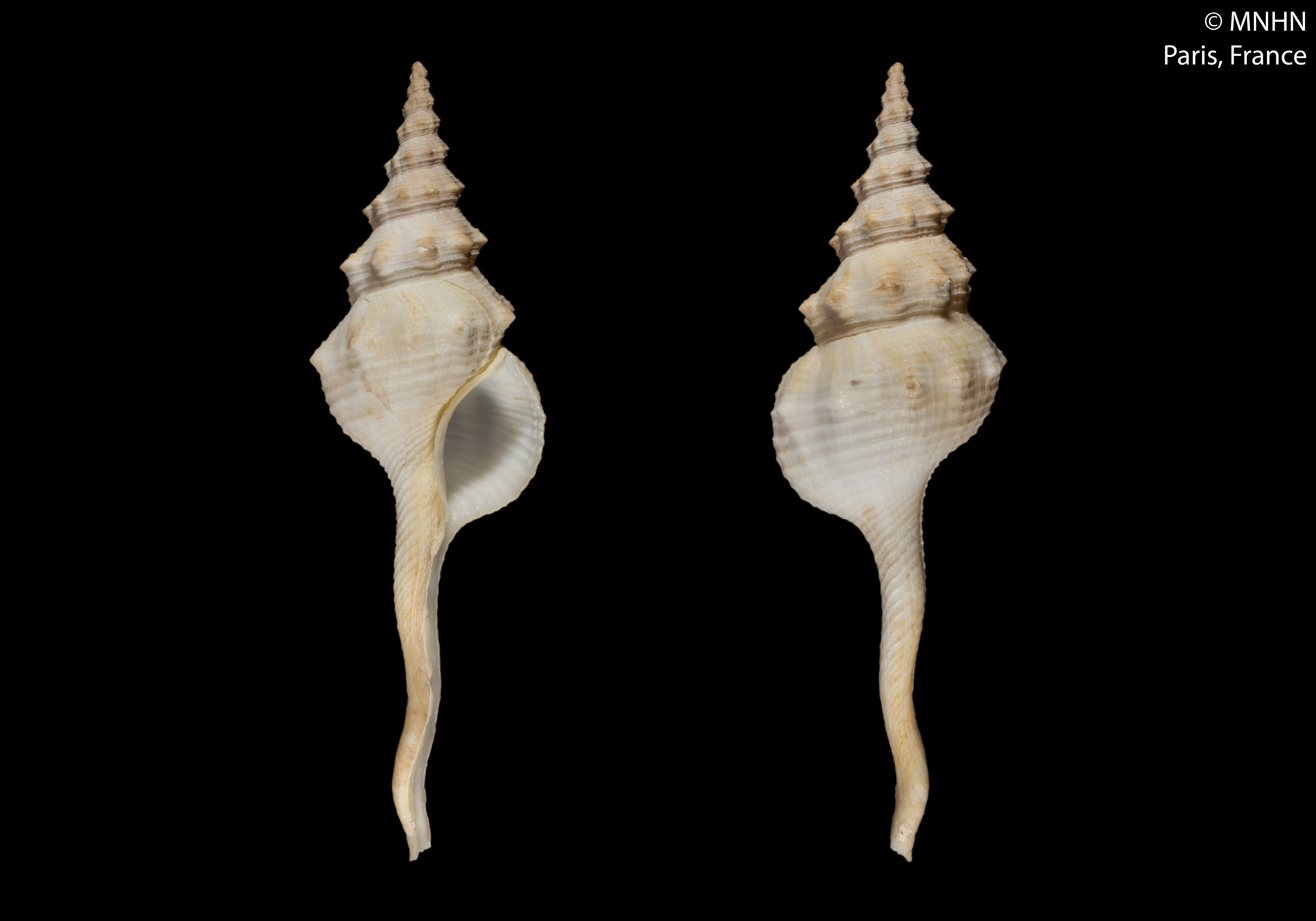

Scientific classification
- Kingdom: Animalia
- Phylum: Mollusca
- Class: Gastropoda
- Subclass: Caenogastropoda
- Order: Neogastropoda
- Family: Fasciolariidae
- Genus: Fusinus
- Species: F. laviniae

Binomial name
- Fusinus laviniae Snyder & Hadorn, 2006

= Fusinus laviniae =

Species of gastropod

Fusinus laviniae is a species of sea snail, a marine gastropod mollusc in the family Fasciolariidae, the spindle snails, the tulip snails and their allies.

== Description ==
The length of the shell attains 114.5 mm.

== Distribution ==
This marine species occurs off New Caledonia.
