= Fusinus hernandezi =

Scientific classification
- Kingdom: Animalia
- Phylum: Mollusca
- Class: Gastropoda
- Subclass: Caenogastropoda
- Order: Neogastropoda
- Family: Fasciolariidae
- Genus: Fusinus
- Species: F. hernandezi

Binomial name
- Fusinus hernandezi Hadorn & Rolán, 2009

Species of gastropod

Fusinus hernandezi is a species of sea snail, a marine gastropod mollusc in the family Fasciolariidae.
