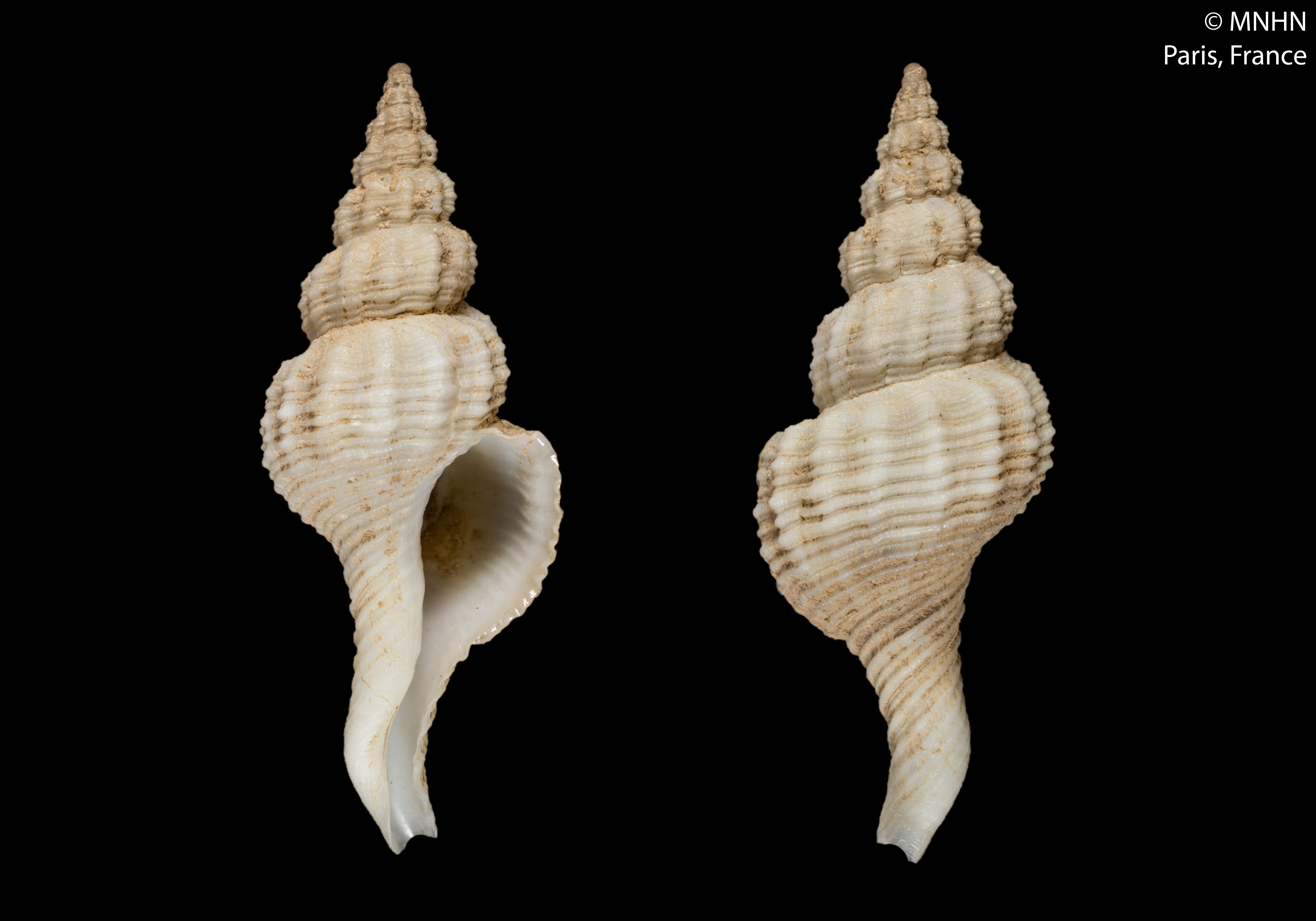

Scientific classification
- Kingdom: Animalia
- Phylum: Mollusca
- Class: Gastropoda
- Subclass: Caenogastropoda
- Order: Neogastropoda
- Family: Fasciolariidae
- Genus: Fusinus
- Species: F. boucheti

Binomial name
- Fusinus boucheti Hadorn & Ryall, 1999

= Fusinus boucheti =

Species of gastropod

Fusinus boucheti is a species of sea snail, a marine gastropod mollusk in the family Fasciolariidae, the spindle snails, the tulip snails and their allies.

== Description ==
The length of the shell attains 45.9 mm.

== Distribution ==
This marine species occurs in the Atlantic Ocean off Morocco.
