= Fusinus schrammi =

Scientific classification
- Kingdom: Animalia
- Phylum: Mollusca
- Class: Gastropoda
- Subclass: Caenogastropoda
- Order: Neogastropoda
- Family: Fasciolariidae
- Genus: Fusinus
- Species: F. schrammi

Binomial name
- Fusinus schrammi (Crosse, 1865)

Synonyms
- Fusus schrammi Crosse, 1865

Species of gastropod

Fusinus schrammi is a species of sea snail, a marine gastropod mollusc in the family Fasciolariidae, the spindle snails, the tulip snails and their allies.

== Description ==
The species attains a length of 70 mm.

== Distribution ==
Deep water: Eastern Caribbean and Lesser Antilles.
