= Fusinus thompsoni =

Scientific classification
- Kingdom: Animalia
- Phylum: Mollusca
- Class: Gastropoda
- Subclass: Caenogastropoda
- Order: Neogastropoda
- Family: Fasciolariidae
- Genus: Fusinus
- Species: F. thompsoni

Binomial name
- Fusinus thompsoni Hadorn & Rogers, 2000

Species of gastropod

Fusinus thompsoni is a species of sea snail, a marine gastropod mollusc in the family Fasciolariidae, the spindle snails, the tulip snails and their allies.

== Description ==
Fusinus thompsoni has a size of about 14 mm. The shell is fusiform, sub translucent and is seven-whorled. The diameter of the species is 0.8-0.9 mm, with 7-8 narrow axial ribs.

== Distribution ==
Fusinus thompsoni is located near east Florida and the Bahamas. The creature usually dwells between 154 and 366 meters in depth.
