= Fusinus albinus =

Scientific classification
- Kingdom: Animalia
- Phylum: Mollusca
- Class: Gastropoda
- Subclass: Caenogastropoda
- Order: Neogastropoda
- Family: Fasciolariidae
- Genus: Fusinus
- Species: F. albinus

Binomial name
- Fusinus albinus (Adams, 1856)

Synonyms
- Fusus albinus Adams, 1856

Species of gastropod

Fusinus albinus is a species of sea snail, a marine gastropod mollusk in the family Fasciolariidae, the spindle snails, the tulip snails and their allies.
