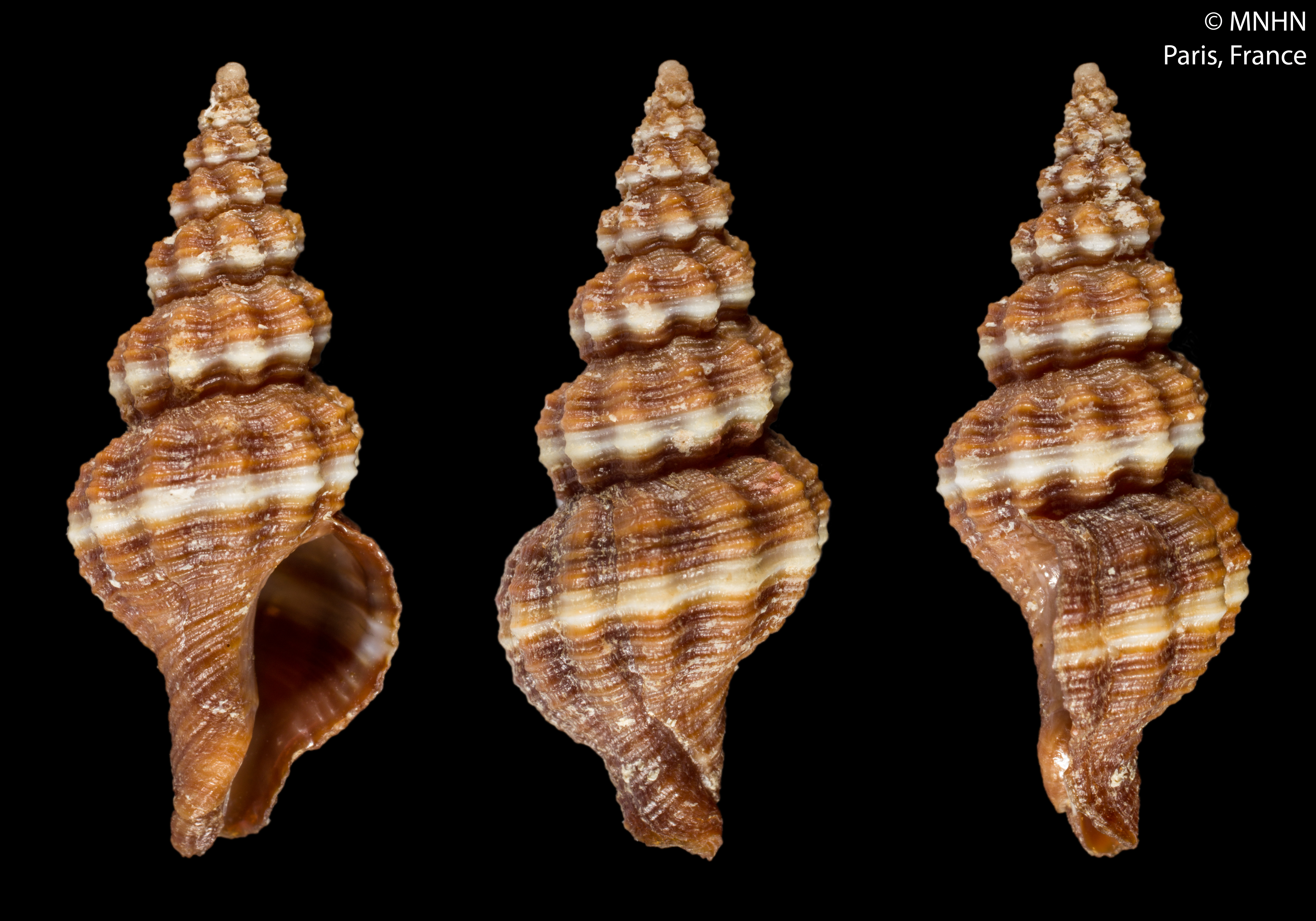
- Shell of Fusinus tenerifensis (holotype at MNHN, Paris)

Scientific classification
- Kingdom: Animalia
- Phylum: Mollusca
- Class: Gastropoda
- Subclass: Caenogastropoda
- Order: Neogastropoda
- Family: Fasciolariidae
- Genus: Fusinus
- Species: F. tenerifensis

Binomial name
- Fusinus tenerifensis Hadorn & Rolán, 1999

= Fusinus tenerifensis =

Species of gastropod

Fusinus tenerifensis is a species of sea snail, a marine gastropod mollusc in the family Fasciolariidae, the spindle snails, the tulip snails and their allies.

== Description ==
The length of the shell attains 21.8 mm.

== Distribution ==
This marine species occurs off Tenerife, Canary Islands.
