= Fusinus gracillimus =

Scientific classification
- Kingdom: Animalia
- Phylum: Mollusca
- Class: Gastropoda
- Subclass: Caenogastropoda
- Order: Neogastropoda
- Family: Fasciolariidae
- Genus: Fusinus
- Species: F. gracillimus

Binomial name
- Fusinus gracillimus (Adams & Reeve, 1848)

Synonyms
- Fusus gracillimus Adams & Reeve, 1848

Species of gastropod

Fusinus gracillimus is a species of sea snail, a marine gastropod mollusk in the family Fasciolariidae, the spindle snails, the tulip snails and their allies.
