= Fusinus pauciliratus =

Scientific classification
- Kingdom: Animalia
- Phylum: Mollusca
- Class: Gastropoda
- Subclass: Caenogastropoda
- Order: Neogastropoda
- Family: Fasciolariidae
- Genus: Fusinus
- Species: F. pauciliratus

Binomial name
- Fusinus pauciliratus (Shuto, 1962)

Species of gastropod

Fusinus pauciliratus is a species of sea snail, a marine gastropod mollusc in the family Fasciolariidae, the spindle snails, the tulip snails and their allies.

== Subspecies ==
- Fusinus pauciliratus complex Snyder, 2000 (synonyms: Fusinus complex Snyder, 2000 (basionym); Fusus simplex E.A. Smith, 1879 (invalid: junior homonym of Fusus simplex Deshayes, 1834, and F. simplex Grateloup, 1847; Fusinus complex is a replacement name); Granulifusus simplex (E.A. Smith, 1879)
- † Fusinus pauciliratus pauciliratus (Shuto, 1962)
