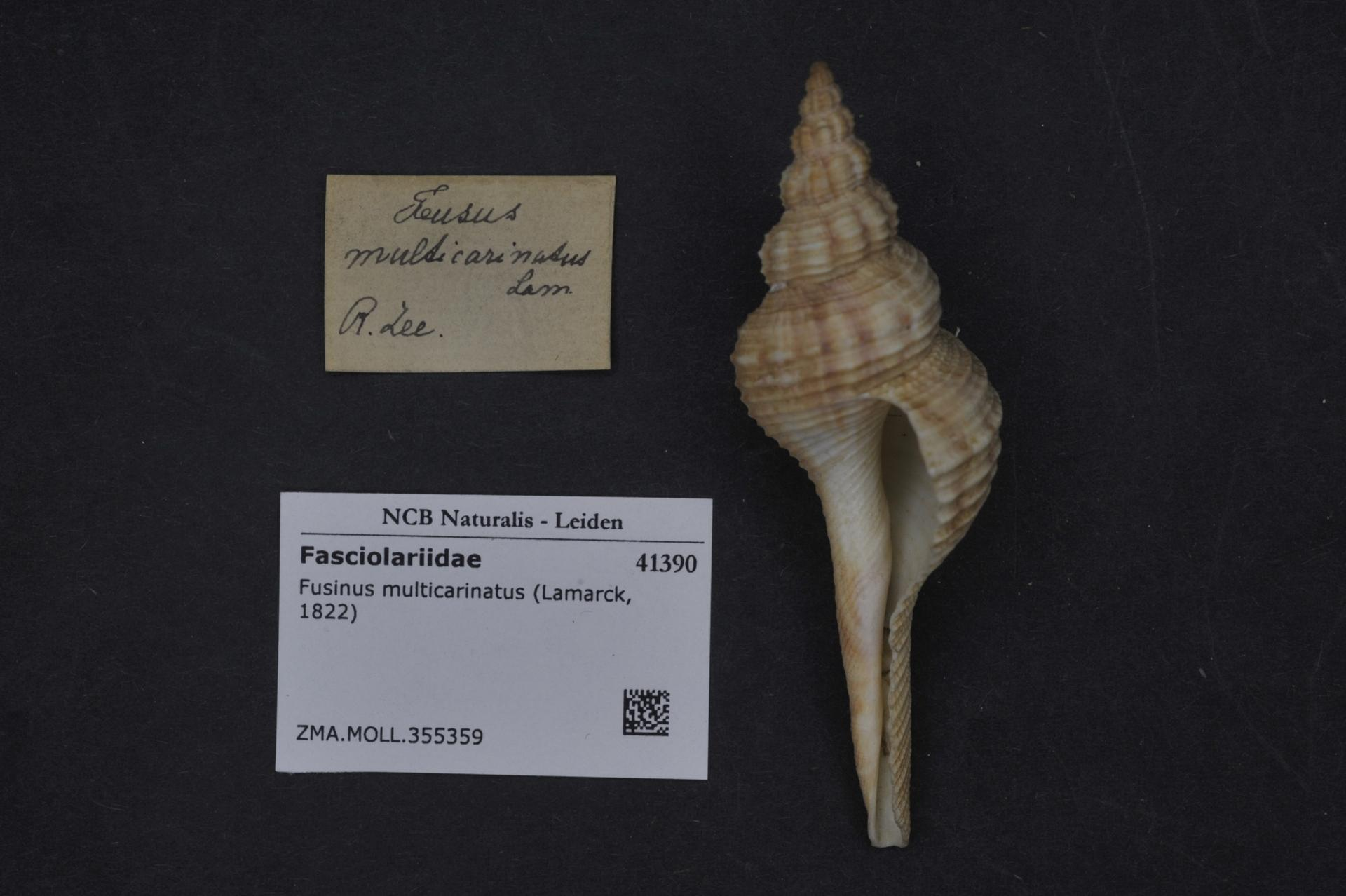

Scientific classification
- Kingdom: Animalia
- Phylum: Mollusca
- Class: Gastropoda
- Subclass: Caenogastropoda
- Order: Neogastropoda
- Family: Fasciolariidae
- Genus: Fusinus
- Species: F. multicarinatus

Binomial name
- Fusinus multicarinatus (Lamarck, 1822)

Synonyms
- Fusus multicarinatus Lamarck, 1822

= Fusinus multicarinatus =

Species of gastropod

Fusinus multicarinatus is a species of sea snail, a marine gastropod mollusk in the family Fasciolariidae, the spindle snails, the tulip snails and their allies.
