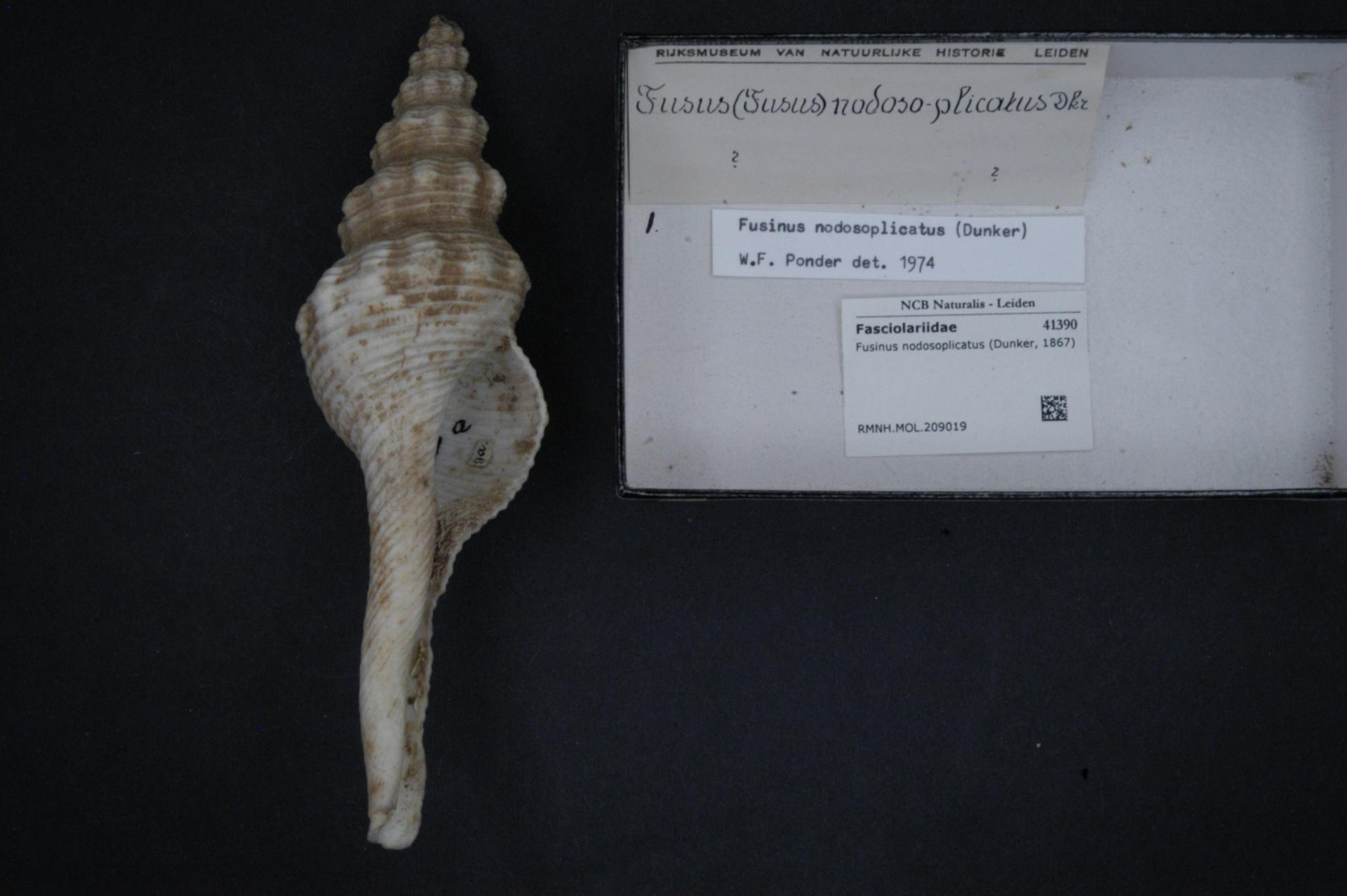

Scientific classification
- Kingdom: Animalia
- Phylum: Mollusca
- Class: Gastropoda
- Subclass: Caenogastropoda
- Order: Neogastropoda
- Family: Fasciolariidae
- Genus: Fusinus
- Species: F. nodosoplicatus

Binomial name
- Fusinus nodosoplicatus (Dunker, 1867)

Synonyms
- Fusus nodosoplicatus Dunker, 1867 (original combination); Fusus inconstans Lischke, 1868; Fusinus grabaui Kuroda & Habe, 1952

= Fusinus nodosoplicatus =

Species of gastropod

Fusinus nodosoplicatus is a species of sea snail, a marine gastropod mollusc in the family Fasciolariidae, the spindle snails, the tulip snails and their allies. It is known in Japan by the common name kobunagashi (コブナガニシ).
