= Fusinus gallagheri =

Scientific classification
- Kingdom: Animalia
- Phylum: Mollusca
- Class: Gastropoda
- Subclass: Caenogastropoda
- Order: Neogastropoda
- Family: Fasciolariidae
- Genus: Fusinus
- Species: F. gallagheri

Binomial name
- Fusinus gallagheri Smythe & Chatfield, 1981

Species of gastropod

Fusinus gallagheri is a species of sea snail, a marine gastropod mollusk in the family Fasciolariidae, the spindle snails, the tulip snails and their allies.

== Description ==
A small sinistral species, found intertidally. Shell size 17 mm.

== Distribution ==
Under rocks at low tide: Masirah island, Oman.
