= Fusinus consetti =

Scientific classification
- Kingdom: Animalia
- Phylum: Mollusca
- Class: Gastropoda
- Subclass: Caenogastropoda
- Order: Neogastropoda
- Family: Fasciolariidae
- Genus: Fusinus
- Species: F. consetti

Binomial name
- Fusinus consetti (Iredale, 1929)

Synonyms
- Colus consetti Iredale, 1929

Species of gastropod

Fusinus consetti is a species of sea snail, a marine gastropod mollusk in the family Fasciolariidae, the spindle snails, the tulip snails and their allies.
