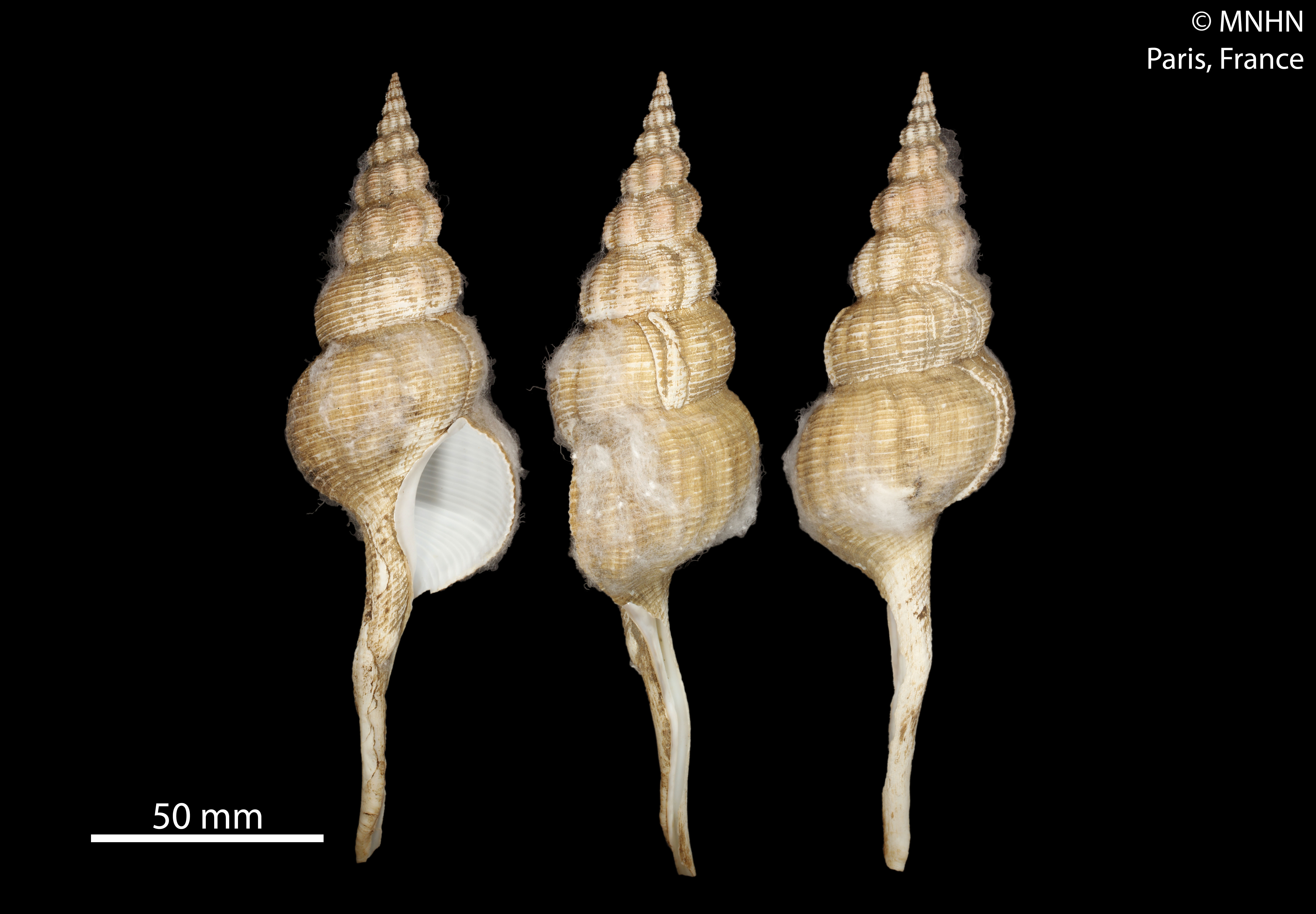

Scientific classification
- Kingdom: Animalia
- Phylum: Mollusca
- Class: Gastropoda
- Subclass: Caenogastropoda
- Order: Neogastropoda
- Family: Fasciolariidae
- Genus: Fusinus
- Species: F. marisinicus

Binomial name
- Fusinus marisinicus Callomon & Snyder, 2009

= Fusinus marisinicus =

Species of gastropod

Fusinus marisinicus is a species of sea snail, a marine gastropod mollusc in the family Fasciolariidae, the spindle snails, the tulip snails and their allies.

== Description ==
The length of the shell attains 172.5 mm, and has a narrow coil like shape with a thin tail stretching 70 mm.

== Distribution ==
This species occurs in the East China Sea.
