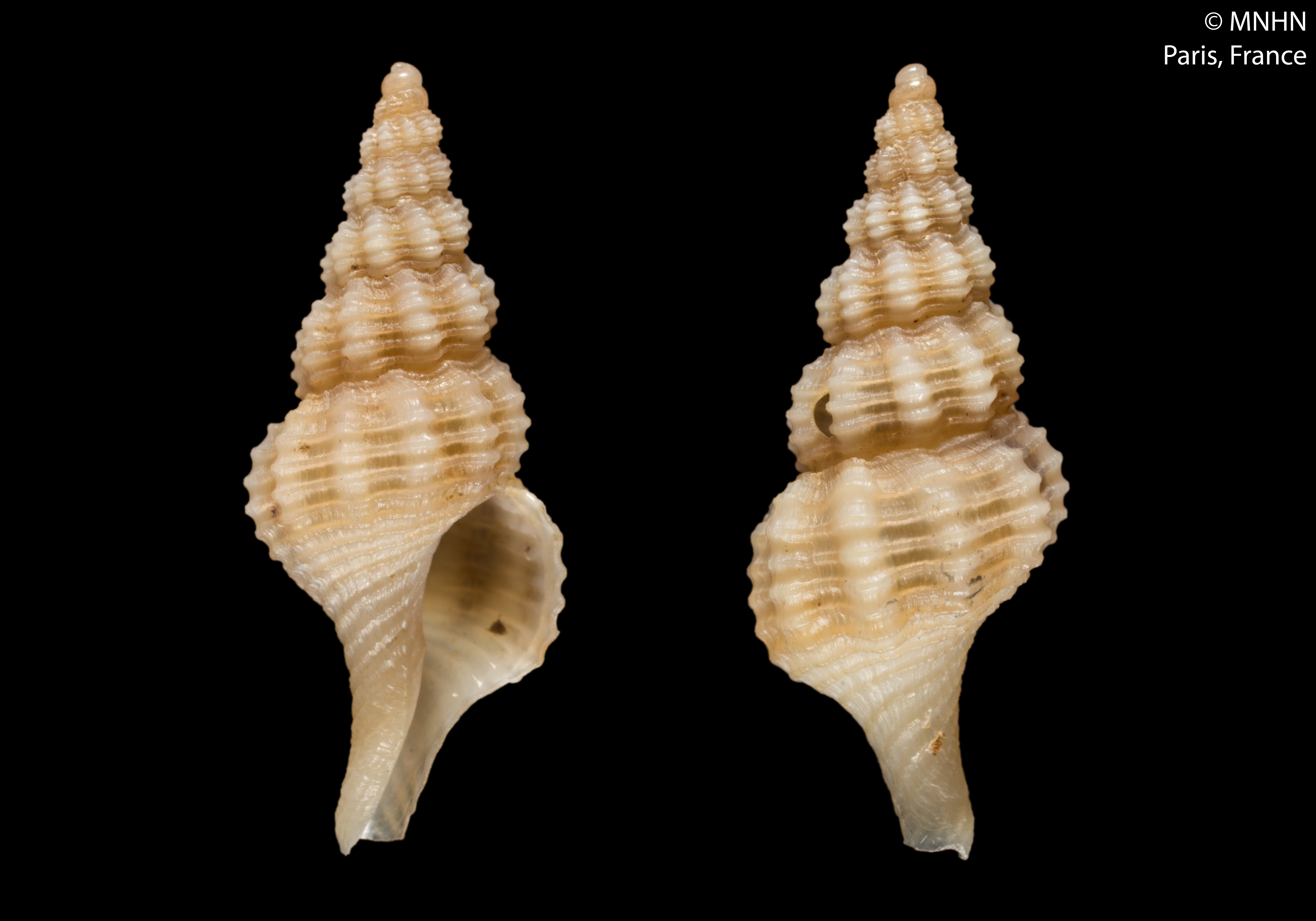
- Shell of Fusinus agadirensis (holotype at MNHN, Paris)

Scientific classification
- Kingdom: Animalia
- Phylum: Mollusca
- Class: Gastropoda
- Subclass: Caenogastropoda
- Order: Neogastropoda
- Family: Fasciolariidae
- Genus: Fusinus
- Species: F. agadirensis

Binomial name
- Fusinus agadirensis Hadorn & Rolàn, 1999

= Fusinus agadirensis =

Species of gastropod

Fusinus agadirensis is a species of sea snail, a marine gastropod mollusk in the family Fasciolariidae, the spindle snails, the tulip snails and their allies.

== Description ==
The length of the shell attains 15.3 mm.

== Distribution ==
This species occurs in the Atlantic Ocean off Morocco.
