= Fusinus barclayi =

Scientific classification
- Kingdom: Animalia
- Phylum: Mollusca
- Class: Gastropoda
- Subclass: Caenogastropoda
- Order: Neogastropoda
- Family: Fasciolariidae
- Genus: Fusinus
- Species: F. barclayi

Binomial name
- Fusinus barclayi (G.B. Sowerby III, 1894)

Synonyms
- Fusus barclayi G.B. Sowerby III, 1894; Sinistralia barclayi (G.B. Sowerby III, 1894)

Species of gastropod

Fusinus barclayi is a species of sea snail, a marine gastropod mollusk in the family Fasciolariidae, the spindle snails, the tulip snails and their allies.
