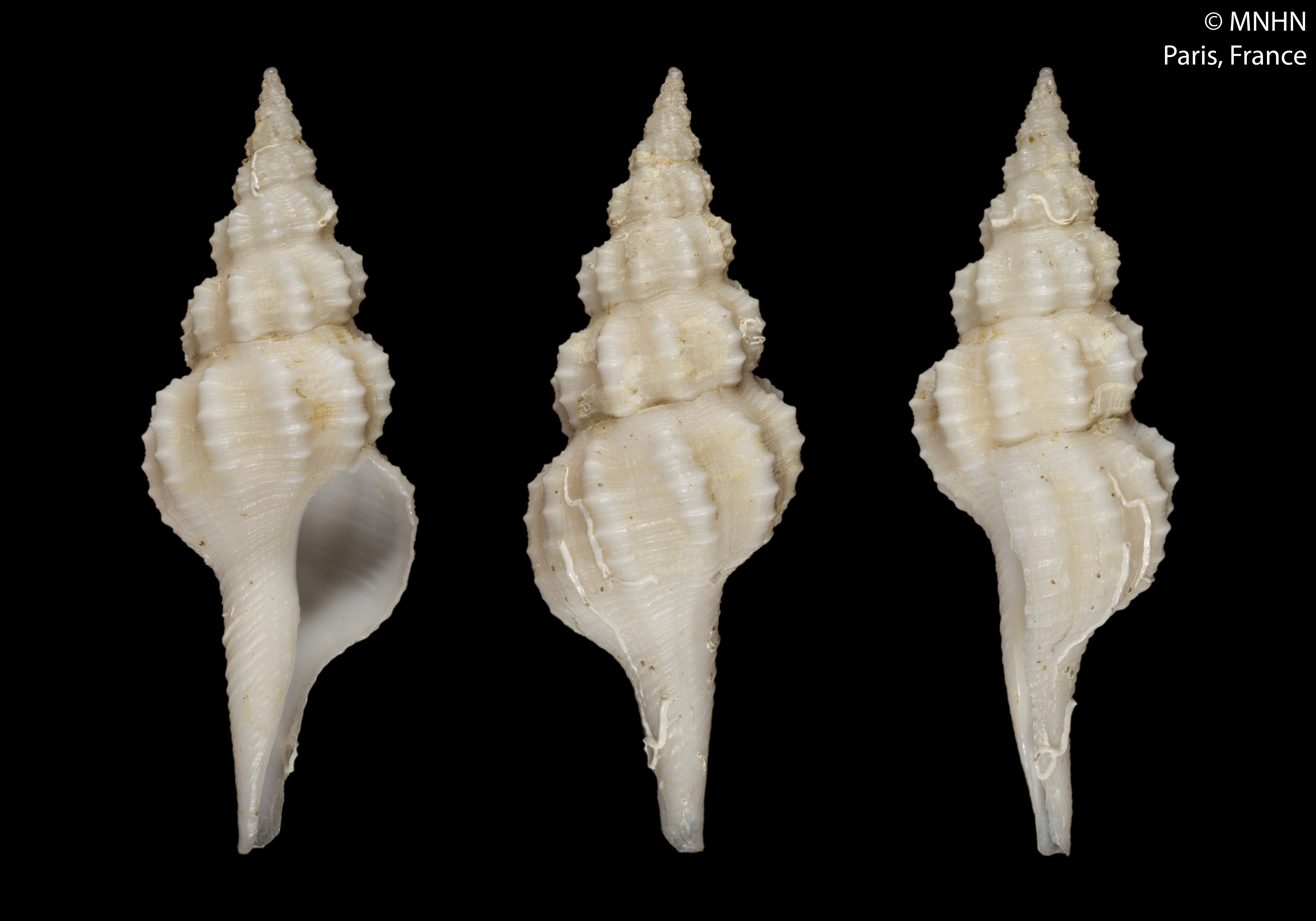
- Shell of Fusinus meteoris (holotype at MNHN, Paris)

Scientific classification
- Kingdom: Animalia
- Phylum: Mollusca
- Class: Gastropoda
- Subclass: Caenogastropoda
- Order: Neogastropoda
- Family: Fasciolariidae
- Genus: Fusinus
- Species: F. meteoris

Binomial name
- Fusinus meteoris Gofas, 2000

= Fusinus meteoris =

Species of gastropod

Fusinus meteoris is a species of sea snail, a marine gastropod mollusk in the family Fasciolariidae, the spindle snails, the tulip snails and their allies.

== Description ==
The average length of the shell is 48.8 mm.

== Distribution ==
The holotype was found on a seamount at the Grand Banc Meteor, Northeast Atlantic Ocean.
