= Fusinus assimilis =

Scientific classification
- Kingdom: Animalia
- Phylum: Mollusca
- Class: Gastropoda
- Subclass: Caenogastropoda
- Order: Neogastropoda
- Family: Fasciolariidae
- Genus: Fusinus
- Species: F. assimilis

Binomial name
- Fusinus assimilis (Adams, 1856)

Synonyms
- Fusus assimilis Adams, 1856

Species of gastropod

Fusinus assimilis is a species of sea snail, a marine gastropod mollusk in the family Fasciolariidae, the spindle snails, the tulip snails and their allies.
