= Fusinus stannum =

Scientific classification
- Kingdom: Animalia
- Phylum: Mollusca
- Class: Gastropoda
- Subclass: Caenogastropoda
- Order: Neogastropoda
- Family: Fasciolariidae
- Genus: Fusinus
- Species: F. stannum

Binomial name
- Fusinus stannum Callomon & Snyder, 2008

Species of gastropod

Fusinus stannum is a species of sea snail, a marine gastropod mollusc. It is in the family Fasciolariidae, which includes the spindle snails and tulip snails. The species was discovered in Indo-Pacific islands including Phuket Island, Andaman Islands, and Nicobar Islands. The new species was declared in 2008.
