= Fusinus diandraensis =

Scientific classification
- Kingdom: Animalia
- Phylum: Mollusca
- Class: Gastropoda
- Subclass: Caenogastropoda
- Order: Neogastropoda
- Family: Fasciolariidae
- Genus: Fusinus
- Species: F. diandraensis

Binomial name
- Fusinus diandraensis Goodwin & Kosuge, 2008

Species of gastropod

Fusinus diandraensis is a species of sea snail, a marine gastropod mollusc in the family Fasciolariidae, the spindle snails, the tulip snails and their allies. The size can range from 90 to 120 mm.
