= Fusinus juliabrownae =

Scientific classification
- Kingdom: Animalia
- Phylum: Mollusca
- Class: Gastropoda
- Subclass: Caenogastropoda
- Order: Neogastropoda
- Family: Fasciolariidae
- Genus: Fusinus
- Species: F. juliabrownae

Binomial name
- Fusinus juliabrownae Callomon, Snyder & Noseworthy, 2009

Species of gastropod

Fusinus juliabrownae is a species of sea snail, a marine gastropod mollusc in the family Fasciolariidae, the spindle snails, the tulip snails and their allies.
