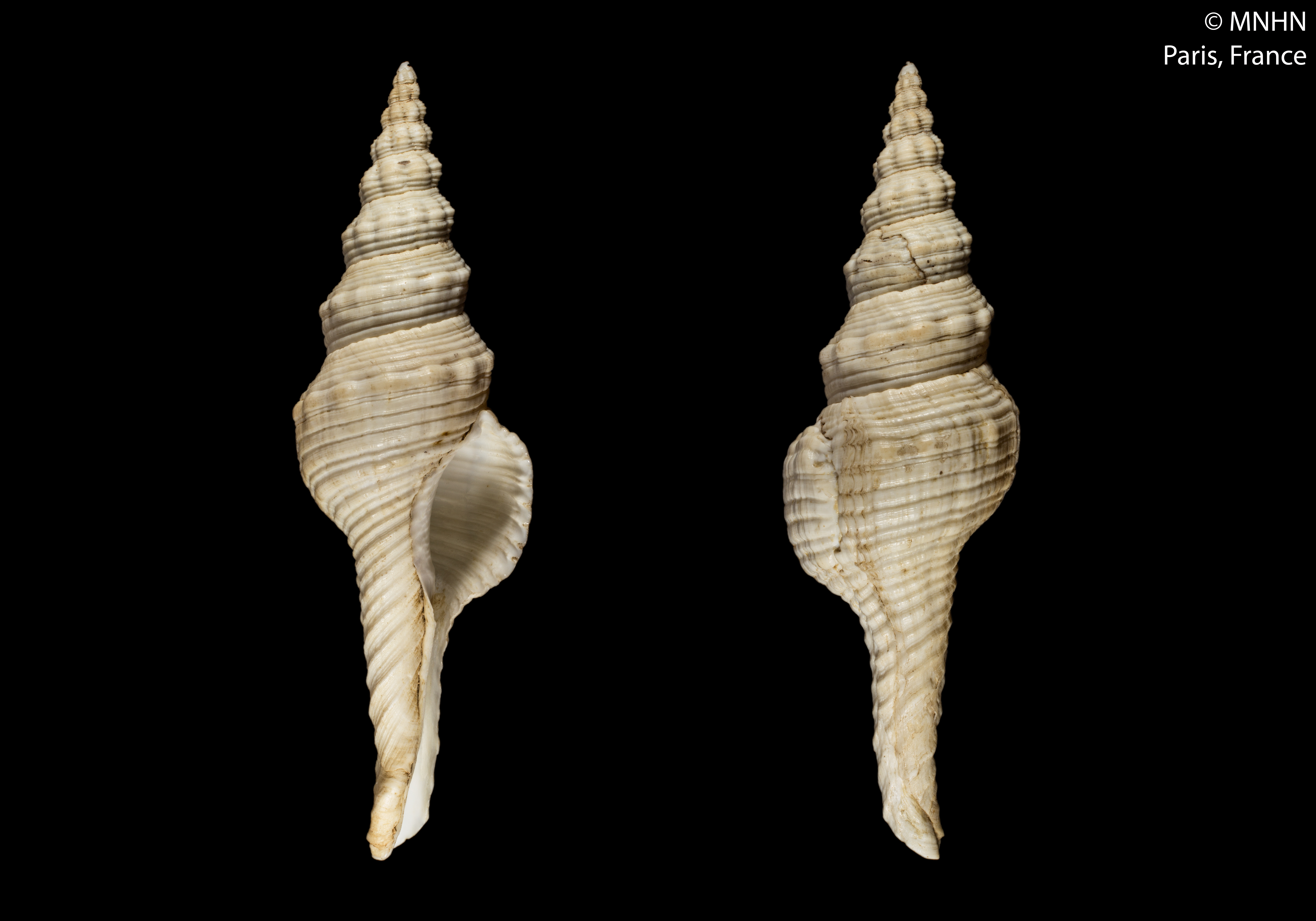
- Shell of Marmorofusus undulatus (syntype at MNHN, Paris)

Scientific classification
- Kingdom: Animalia
- Phylum: Mollusca
- Class: Gastropoda
- Subclass: Caenogastropoda
- Order: Neogastropoda
- Family: Fasciolariidae
- Genus: Marmorofusus
- Species: M. undulatus

Binomial name
- Marmorofusus undulatus (Gmelin, 1791)

Synonyms
- Fusinus laticostatus (Deshayes, 1831); Fusinus undulatus (Gmelin, 1791); Fusus fasciatus Röding, 1798; Fusus laticostatus Deshayes, 1831; Murex undulatus Gmelin, 1791; Murex variegatus Perry, 1811

= Marmorofusus undulatus =

Species of gastropod

Marmorofusus undulatus is a species of sea snail, a marine gastropod mollusc in the family Fasciolariidae, the spindle snails, the tulip snails and their allies.
