= Goniofusus spectrum =

Scientific classification
- Kingdom: Animalia
- Phylum: Mollusca
- Class: Gastropoda
- Subclass: Caenogastropoda
- Order: Neogastropoda
- Family: Fasciolariidae
- Genus: Goniofusus
- Species: G. spectrum

Binomial name
- Goniofusus spectrum (A. Adams & Reeve, 1848)

Synonyms
- Fusinus panamensis Dall, 1908; Fusinus spectrum (A. Adams & Reeve, 1848); Fusinus spectrum var. albus (Philippi, 1852); Fusinus spectrum var. reeveanus (Philippi, 1850); Fusus albus (Philippi, 1852); Fusus reeveanus (Philippi, 1850); Fusus spectrum A. Adams & Reeve, 1848: Fusus spectrum var. albus Philippi, 1852; Fusus spectrum var. reeveanus Philippi, 1850

Species of gastropod

Goniofusus spectrum is a species of sea snail, a marine gastropod mollusk in the family Fasciolariidae, the spindle snails, the tulip snails and their allies.

== Distribution ==
Dredged at 100-180 feet in open water, off Cocos Island, Pacific side of Costa Rica.
