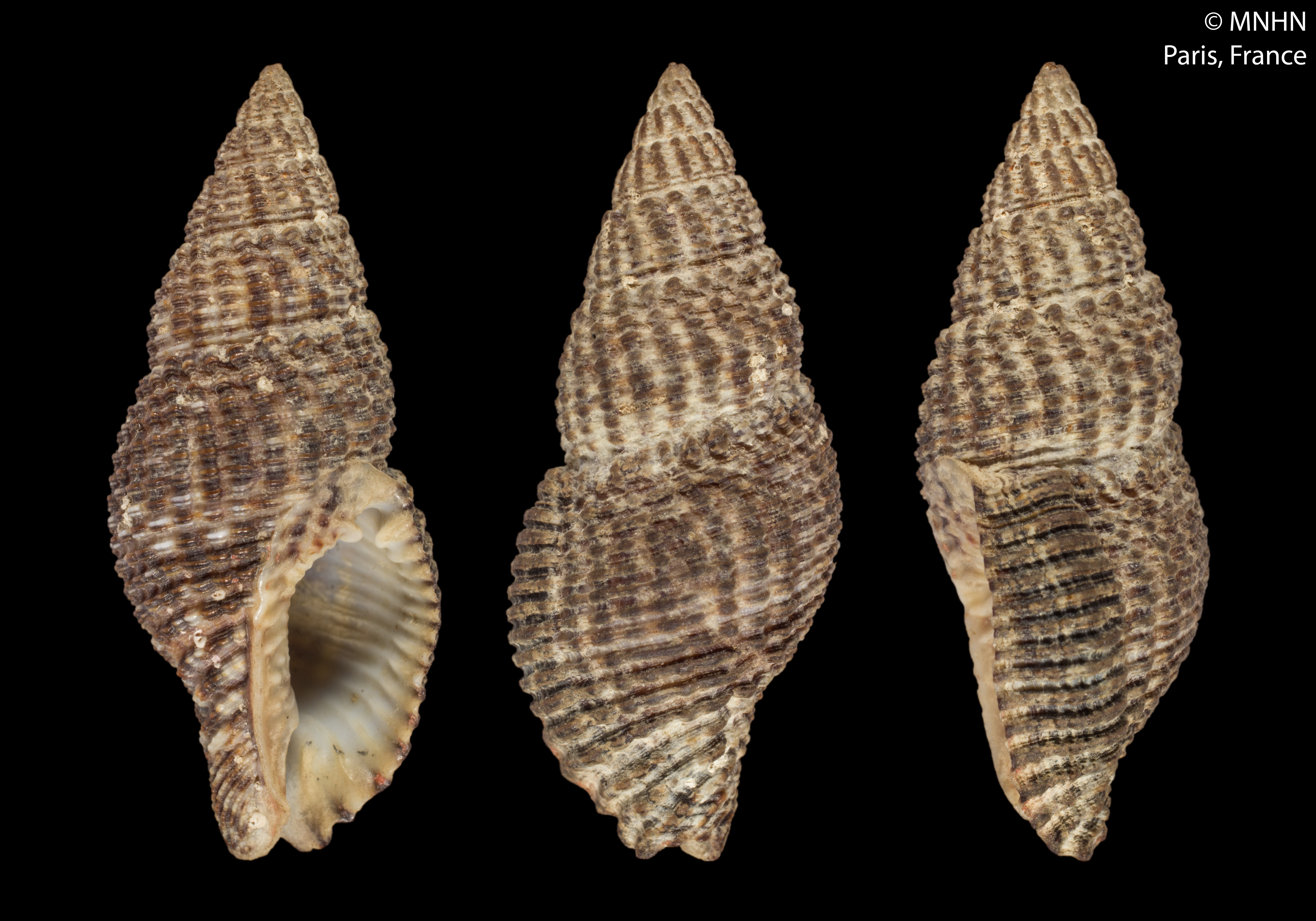

Scientific classification
- Kingdom: Animalia
- Phylum: Mollusca
- Class: Gastropoda
- Subclass: Caenogastropoda
- Order: Neogastropoda
- Family: Fasciolariidae
- Subfamily: Fusininae
- Genus: Fusus; Bruguière, 1789

Type species
- Murex colus Lamarck, 1799

Species
- See text

= Fusus =

Genus of gastropods

Fusus is a genus of small to large sea snails, marine gastropod molluscs in the family Fasciolariidae, the spindle snails and tulip snails.

Fusus as a name for a genus of gastropods has confusingly been used three times. These names are, in whatever taxonomical sense, now invalid. This page is kept for historical reasons.

The name of the genus Fusus Bruguière, 1789 is invalid as it is a junior homonym of Fusus Helbling, 1779. (Placed by the ICZN on the Official Index by Opinion 1765, 1994, Bulletin of Zoological Nomenclature, 51(2): 159). The accepted name is Fusinus Rafinesque, 1815

The genus Fusus Helbling, 1779, has also been placed on the Official Index by Opinion 1765 (1994, Bulletin of Zoological Nomenclature 51(2): 159-161), i.e. it cannot be used as a valid name. The type species of Fusus Helbling is Murex intertextus Helbling, 1779 (= Fusus intertextus Helbling, 1779), and it belongs in the family Colubrariidae.

Fusus Helbling, 1779 (Mollusca, Gastropoda) has been suppressed, and Fusinus Rafinesque, 1815 and Colubraria Schumacher, 1817 are conserved. ICZN 1993. Opinion 1765. Bulletin of Zoological Nomenclature, 51(2): 159-161 CZN 1993. Opinion 1765. Bulletin of Zoological Nomenclature, 51(2): 159-161

The genus Fusus Röding, 1798 (type species = Fusus cynara Röding, 1798 = Turbinella angulata (Lightfoot, 1786) ) is a junior homonym of Fusus Helbling, 1779. It has also been placed on the Official Index of the ICZN by Opinion 1765 and is an invalid name.

== Species ==
The following species with specific epithets of species now placed in Colubrariidae, have been placed arbitrarily in the genus Fusus Helbling, 1779

- Fusus adjunctus (Iredale, 1929): synonym of Cumia adjuncta (Iredale, 1929)
- Fusus alfredensis (Bartsch, 1915): synonym of Cumia alfredensis (Bartsch, 1915)
- Fusus bednalli (Brazier, 1875): synonym of Cumia bednalli (Brazier, 1875)
- Fusus brazieri (Angas, 1869): synonym of Cumia brazieri (Angas, 1869)
- Fusus lucasi Bozzetti, 2007: synonym of Cumia lucasi (Bozzetti, 2007)
- Fusus mestayerae Iredale, 1915: synonym of Cumia mestayerae (Iredale, 1915)
- Fusus schoutanicus (May, 1910): synonym of Cumia schoutanica (May, 1910)
- Fusus simonis Bozzetti, 2004: synonym of Cumia simonis (Bozzetti, 2004)

Species within the genus Fusus Bruguière, 1789 include arbitrarily all the species that haven't been designated to Fusus Helbling, 1779:. Most species have been synonymized with a species in Fusinus.

- Fusus aurantius Anton, 1838: nomen dubium
- Fusus blainvillii Mavarigna, 1840: nomen dubium
- Fusus blakensis Hadorn & Roger, 2000: synonym of Fusinus blakensis Hadorn & Roger, 2000
- Fusus branscombi Clark W., 1849: synonym of Comarmondia gracilis (Montagu, 1803)
- Fusus brevis Brown, 1827: nomen dubium
- Fusus chonoticus Philippi, 1858: nomen dubium
- Fusus clavatus della Chiaje, 1830: nomen dubium
- Fusus colus (Linnaeus, 1758): synonym of Fusinus colus (Linnaeus, 1758)
- Fusus contabulatus Anton, 1838: nomen dubium
- Fusus crassus Pallary, 1901: synonym of Fusinus cretellai Buzzurro & Russo, 2008
- Fusus crebricostatus Lamarck, 1822: nomen dubium
- Fusus cygneus Philippi, 1852: nomen dubium
- Fusus dalli Watson, 1882: synonym of Granulifusus dalli (Watson, 1882)
- Fusus dexter Menke, 1829: nomen dubium
- Fusus doliatus Valenciennes, 1832: nomen dubium
- Fusus dunkeri Jonas, 1846: synonym of Microcolus dunkeri (Jonas, 1846)
- Fusus elegantissimus Bioni Giunti, 1860: nomen dubium
- Fusus filosa (A. Adams & Reeve, 1850): synonym of Polygona filosa
- Fusus follicus Lesson, 1842 :: nomen dubium
- Fusus frondosus Lesson, 1842: nomen dubium
- Fusus fusconodosus G.B. Sowerby II, 1880: nomen dubium
- Fusus gieseckii Anton, 1839: nomen dubium
- Fusus gilvus Philippi, 1849: nomen dubium
- Fusus glacialis Gray, 1839: nomen dubium
- Fusus glomeratus Mörch, 1852: nomen dubium
- Fusus gracilis Koch, 1845: nomen dubium
- Fusus granulosus Anton, 1839: nomen dubium
- Fusus guttatus Busch, 1844: nomen dubium
- Fusus harfordii Stearns, 1871: synonym of Fusinus harfordii (Stearns, 1871)
- Fusus heterostrophus de Gregorio, 1885: nomen dubium
- Fusus imbricatus Lesson, 1842 : synonym of Lataxiena desserti Houart, 1995
- Fusus incertus Smith, 1906: nomen dubium
- Fusus indicus Anton, 1838: synonym of Marmorofusus tuberculatus (Lamarck, 1822)
- Fusus junior Audouin, 1826: nomen dubium
- Fusus juvenis Bivona, 1838: nomen dubium
- Fusus lanceolatus Koch, 1846: nomen dubium
- Fusus lateroides (Monterosato, 1891): synonym of Fusinus rostratus (Olivi, 1792)
- Fusus libratus Watson, 1886: synonym of Granulifusus dalli (Watson, 1882)
- Fusus lineatus Menke, 1829: nomen dubium
- Fusus liratus Philippi, 1887: synonym of Xymenopsis muriciformis (King & Broderip, 1833)
- Fusus lusitanicus Allen, 1858: nomen dubium
- Fusus luteopictus Dall, 1887: synonym of Fusinus luteopictus
- Fusus maroccensis (Gmelin, 1791): synonym of Fusinus maroccensis (Gmelin, 1791)
- Fusus monachus Anton, 1838: nomen dubium
- Fusus muricinus Anton, 1839: nomen dubium
- Fusus nigrinus Philippi, 1858: nomen dubium
- Fusus niponicus Smith, 1879: synonym of Granulifusus niponicus (E.A. Smith, 1879)
- Fusus niveus Gray, 1838: nomen dubium
- Fusus nobilis Reeve, 1847: synonym of Fusinus nobilis (Reeve, 1847)
- Fusus nodicinctus A. Adams, 1855: synonym of Otopleura nodicincta (A. Adams, 1855)
- Fusus obscurus Philippi, 1844: nomen dubium
- Fusus pazi Crosse, 1859: nomen dubium
- Fusus perminutus (Dall, 1927): synonym of Americominella perminuta
- Fusus philippi Jonas, 1846: nomen dubium
- Fusus pictus (Turton, 1825): nomen dubium
- Fusus pleurotomoides Anton, 1838: nomen dubium
- Fusus plicosus (Menke, 1830): nomen dubium
- Fusus productus Mörch, 1876: nomen dubium
- Fusus prolongata Turton, 1932: nomen dubium
- Fusus punctatus Anton, 1838: nomen dubium
- Fusus pyruloides Lesson, 1842: nomen dubium
- Fusus retroversus Fleming, 1823: synonym of Limacina retroversa (Fleming, 1823)
- Fusus roedingi Anton, 1838: nomen dubium
- Fusus rolani Buzzurro & Ovalis, 2005: synonym of Fusinus rolani Buzzurro & Ovalis, 2005
- Fusus roseus Hombron & Jacquinot, 1848: synonym of Pareuthria powelli Cernohorsky, 1977
- Fusus rubens Lamarck, 1822: nomen dubium
- Fusus rugosus Lamarck, 1816: nomen dubium
- Fusus sinuatus Lesson, 1842: nomen dubium
- Fusus steneus Nardo, 1847: nomen dubium
- Fusus sulcatus Lamarck: synonym of Penion sulcatus (Lamarck, 1816)
- Fusus syracusanus (Linnaeus, 1758): synonym of Fusinus syracusanus (Linnaeus, 1758)
- Fusus thielei Schepman, 1911: synonym of Fusinus thielei (Schepman, 1911)
- Fusus toreuma (Martyn, 1784): synonym of Fusinus colus (Linnaeus, 1758)
- Fusus triskaedekagonus Anton, 1838: nomen dubium
- Fusus tuberculatus Lamarck, 1822: synonym of Fusinus colus (Linnaeus, 1758)
- Fusus varicosus Anton, 1838: nomen dubium
- Fusus ventricosus Lesson, 1842: nomen dubium
- Fusus verrucosus (Gmelin, 1791): synonym of Fusinus verrucosus (Gmelin, 1791)
- Fusus virga Gray, 1839: nomen dubium
- Fusus zebrinus Odhner, 1923: synonym of Fusinus zebrinus (Odhner, 1923)
