= Aptyxis =

Scientific classification
- Kingdom: Animalia
- Phylum: Mollusca
- Class: Gastropoda
- Subclass: Caenogastropoda
- Order: Neogastropoda
- Superfamily: Buccinoidea
- Family: Fasciolariidae
- Genus: Aptyxis; Troschel, 1868

Type species
- Murex syracusanus Linnaeus, 1758

Species
- See text

Synonyms
- Aptysis [sic] (misspelling of Aptyxis Troschel, 1868); Latirus (Aptyxis) Troschel, 1868

Genus of gastropods

Aptyxis is a genus of sea snails, marine gastropod mollusks in the family Fasciolariidae, the spindle snails, the tulip snails and their allies.

== Species ==
Species within the genus Aptyxis include:

- Aptyxis syracusana (Linnaeus, 1758)

Species brought into synonymy

- Aptyxis luteopicta (Dall, 1877): synonym of Hesperaptyxis luteopictus (Dall, 1877)
