= Harfordia =

Harfordia is the scientific name of two genera of organisms and may refer to:

- Harfordia (gastropod), a genus of sea snails in the family Fasciolariidae
- Harfordia (plant), a genus of plants in the family Polygonaceae
