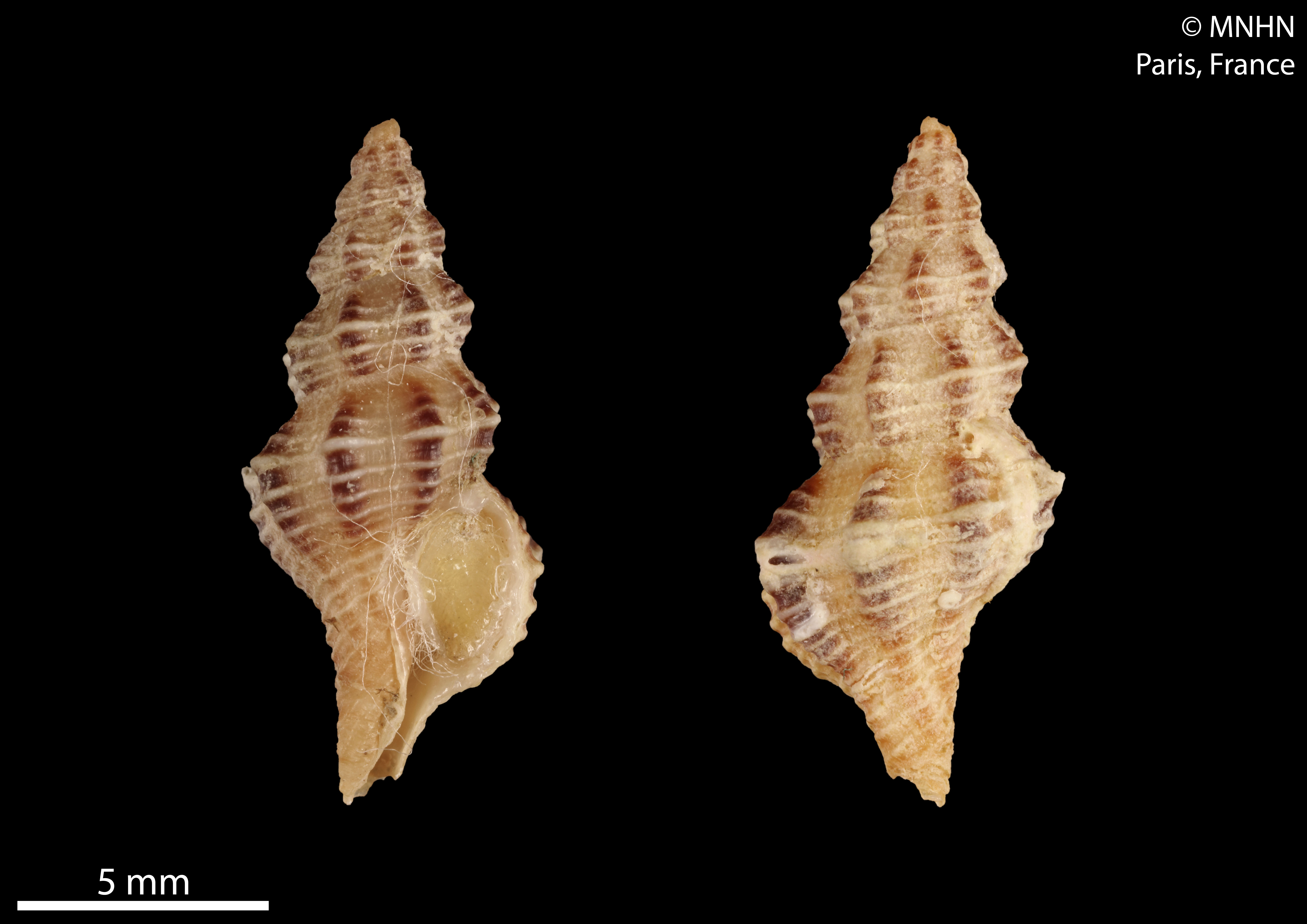
- Shell of Aegeofusinus margaritae (specimen at MNHN, paris)

Scientific classification
- Kingdom: Animalia
- Phylum: Mollusca
- Class: Gastropoda
- Subclass: Caenogastropoda
- Order: Neogastropoda
- Family: Fasciolariidae
- Genus: Aegeofusinus
- Species: A. margaritae

Binomial name
- Aegeofusinus margaritae (Buzzurro & Russo, 2007)

Synonyms
- Fusinus margaritae Buzzurro & Russo, 2007 (original combination)

= Aegeofusinus margaritae =

Species of gastropod

Aegeofusinus margaritae is a species of sea snail, a marine gastropod mollusk in the family Fasciolariidae, the spindle snails, the tulip snails and their allies.

== Distribution ==
This species occurs in the Aegean Sea.
