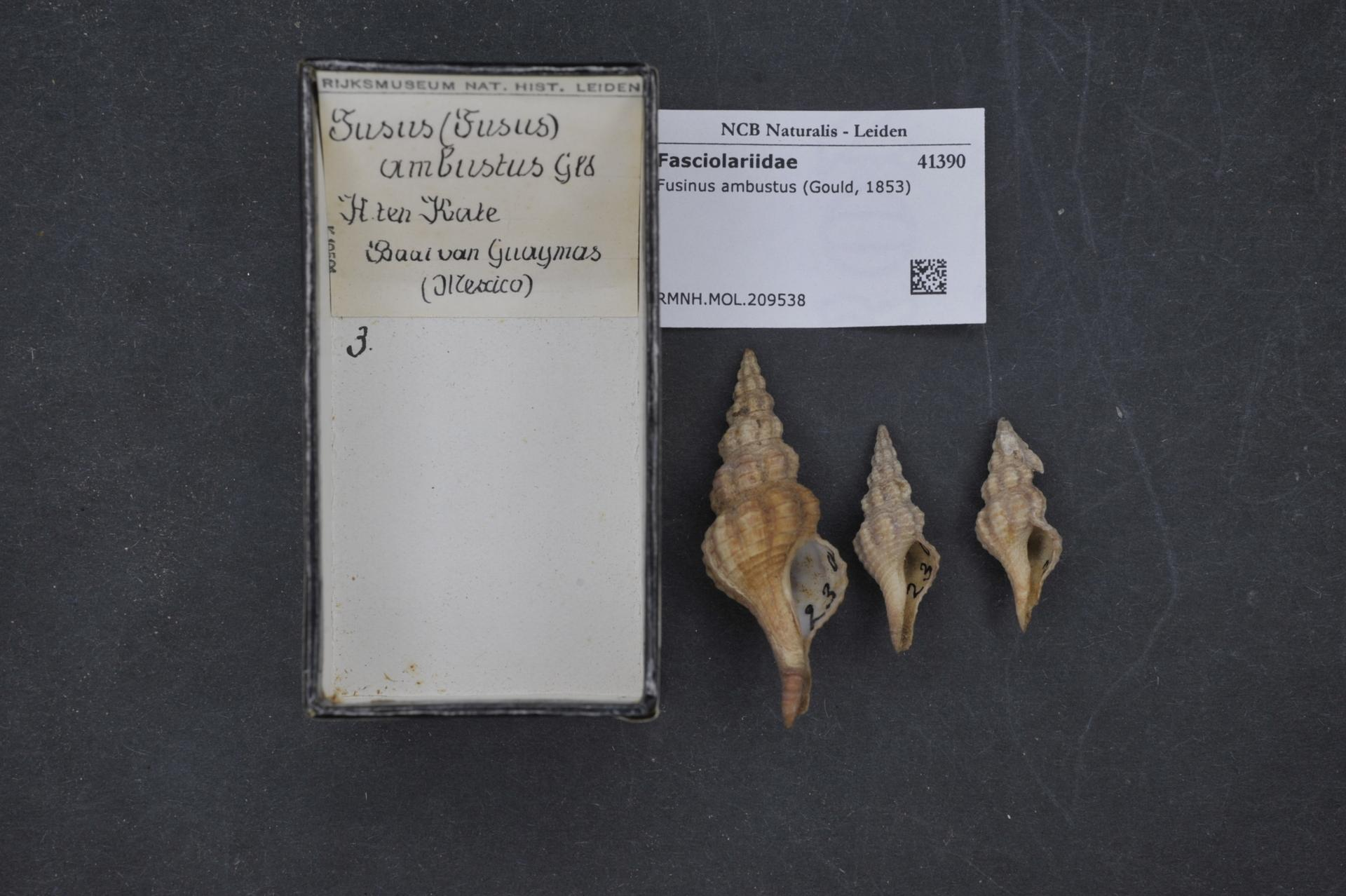
- Hesperaptyxis ambustus (Fusinus ambustus) described by Gould in 1853

Scientific classification
- Kingdom: Animalia
- Phylum: Mollusca
- Class: Gastropoda
- Subclass: Caenogastropoda
- Order: Neogastropoda
- Family: Fasciolariidae
- Genus: Hesperaptyxis
- Species: H. ambustus

Binomial name
- Hesperaptyxis ambustus (Gould, 1853)

Synonyms
- Fusinus ambustus (Gould, 1853); Fusus ambustus Gould, 1853

= Hesperaptyxis ambustus =

Species of gastropod

Hesperaptyxis ambustus is a species of sea snail, a marine gastropod mollusc in the family Fasciolariidae, the spindle snails, the tulip snails and their allies.
