= Pseudofusus dimassai =

Scientific classification
- Kingdom: Animalia
- Phylum: Mollusca
- Class: Gastropoda
- Subclass: Caenogastropoda
- Order: Neogastropoda
- Family: Fasciolariidae
- Genus: Pseudofusus
- Species: P. dimassai

Binomial name
- Pseudofusus dimassai (Buzzurro & Russo, 2007)

Synonyms
- Fusinus dimassai Buzzurro & Russo, 2007 superseded combination

Species of gastropod

Pseudofusus dimassai is a species of sea snail, a marine gastropod mollusk in the family Fasciolariidae, the spindle snails, the tulip snails and their allies.
