= Pseudofusus rusticulus =

Scientific classification
- Kingdom: Animalia
- Phylum: Mollusca
- Class: Gastropoda
- Subclass: Caenogastropoda
- Order: Neogastropoda
- Family: Fasciolariidae
- Genus: Pseudofusus
- Species: P. rusticulus

Binomial name
- Pseudofusus rusticulus (Monterosato, 1880)

Synonyms
- Fusinus rusticulus (Monterosato, 1880); Trophon rostratus var. rusticulus Monterosato, 1880

Species of gastropod

Pseudofusus rusticulus is a species of sea snail, a marine gastropod mollusc in the family Fasciolariidae, the spindle snails, the tulip snails and their allies.
