= Hesperaptyxis cinereus =

Scientific classification
- Kingdom: Animalia
- Phylum: Mollusca
- Class: Gastropoda
- Subclass: Caenogastropoda
- Order: Neogastropoda
- Family: Fasciolariidae
- Genus: Hesperaptyxis
- Species: H. cinereus

Binomial name
- Hesperaptyxis cinereus (Reeve, 1847)

Synonyms
- Fusinus cinerea Reeve, 1847; Turbinella cinerea Reeve, 1847

Species of gastropod

Hesperaptyxis cinereus is a species of sea snail, a marine gastropod mollusc in the family Fasciolariidae, the spindle snails, the tulip snails and their allies.
