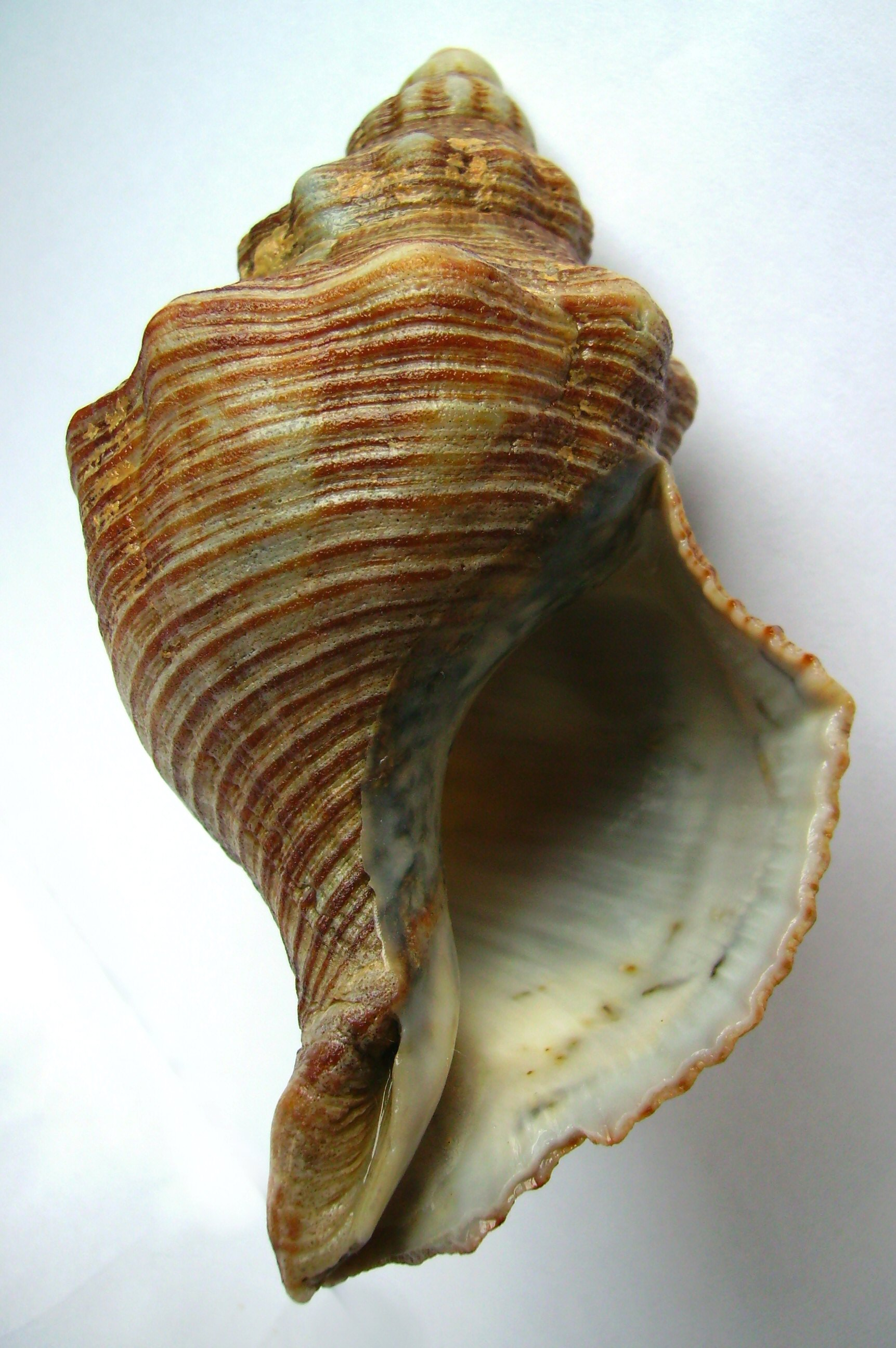
- Dorsal view of a shell of Penion sulcatus

Scientific classification
- Kingdom: Animalia
- Phylum: Mollusca
- Class: Gastropoda
- Subclass: Caenogastropoda
- Order: Neogastropoda
- Family: Austrosiphonidae
- Genus: Penion
- Species: P. sulcatus

Binomial name
- Penion sulcatus (Lamarck, 1816)

Synonyms
- Fusus sulcatus Lamarck, 1816; Fusus zelandicus Quoy and Gaimard, 1833; Fusus adustus Philippi, 1845

= Penion sulcatus =

Penion sulcatus Temporal range: Early Pliocene to Recent, 5.3–0.0 Ma

Species of gastropod

Penion sulcatus is a species of medium-to-large predatory marine snail or whelk, commonly called the northern siphon whelk or kākara nui in Māori, belonging to the whelk family Austrosiphonidae.

== Description ==
Penion sulcatus is a medium-to-large species of Penion siphon whelk. Shells are highly variable in sculpture and colouration, but shells are often dark with a white aperture.

The extinct species Penion exoptatus, Penion clifdenensis, and potentially also Penion marwicki, may belong to the same evolutionary lineage as the extant species Penion sulcatus. This hypothesis is based on geometric morphometric analysis of shell shape and size for all four taxa, as well as the analysis of morphometric variation exhibited all living species of Penion.

Example shells
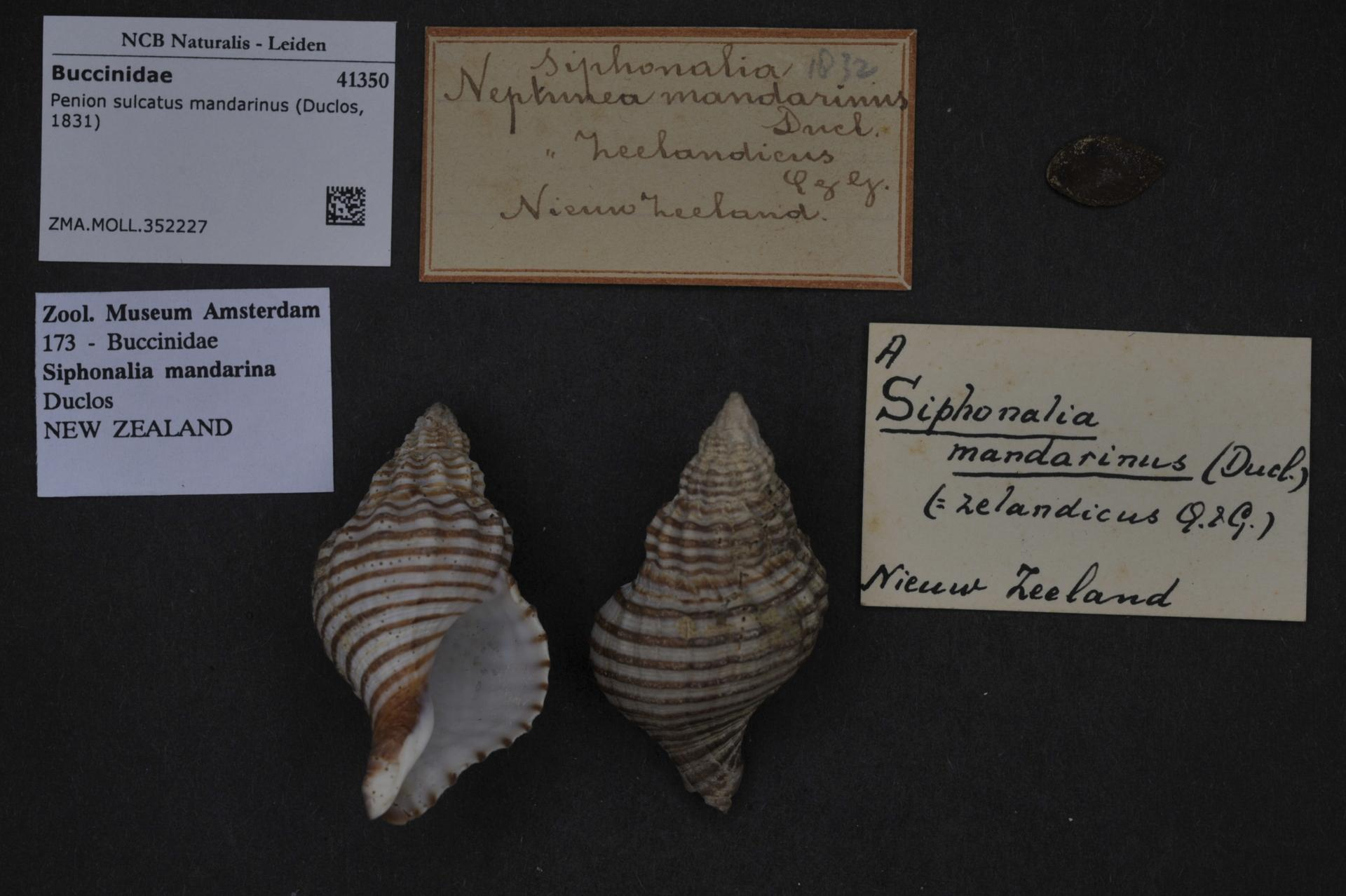
A modern, beach worn shell

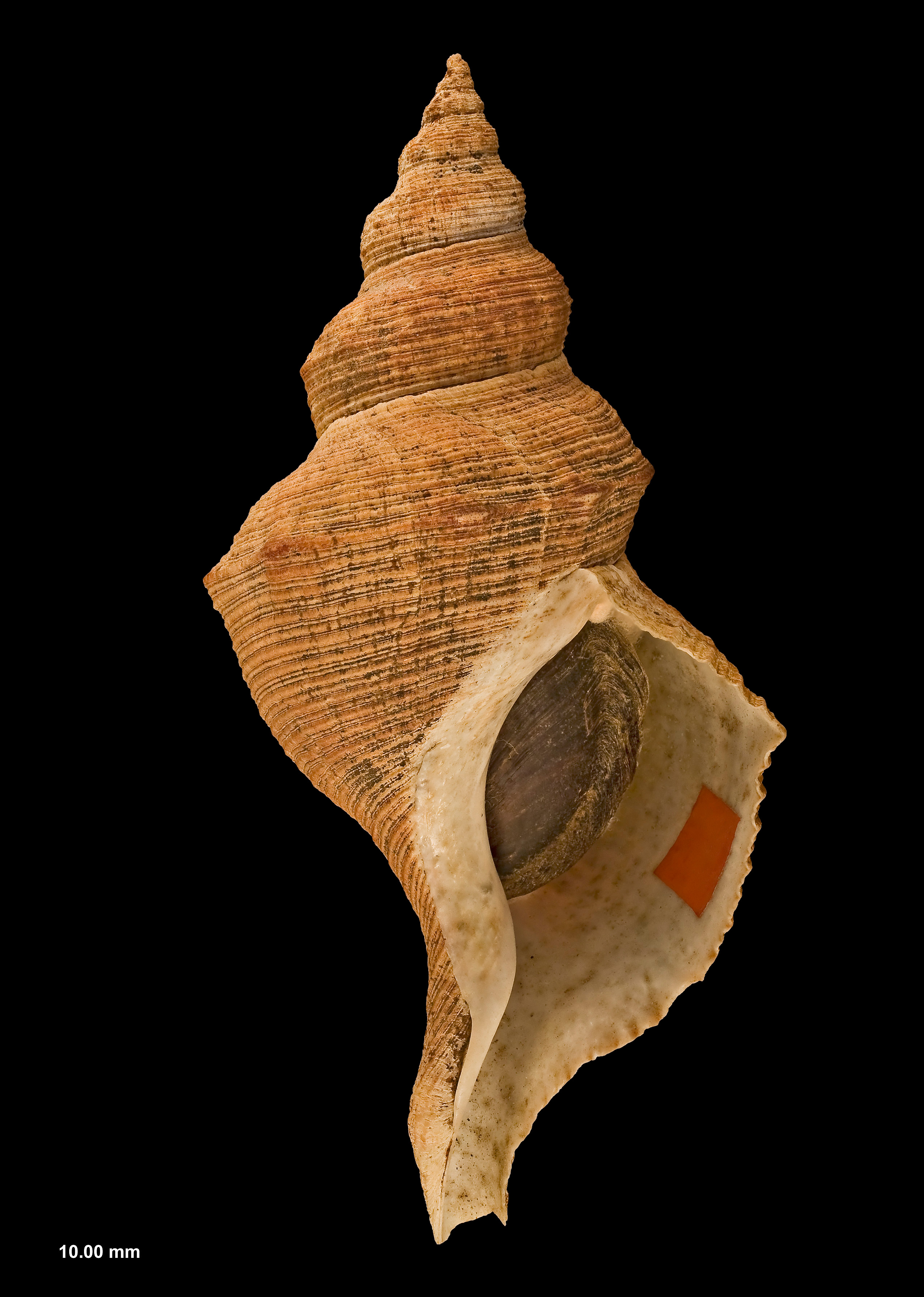

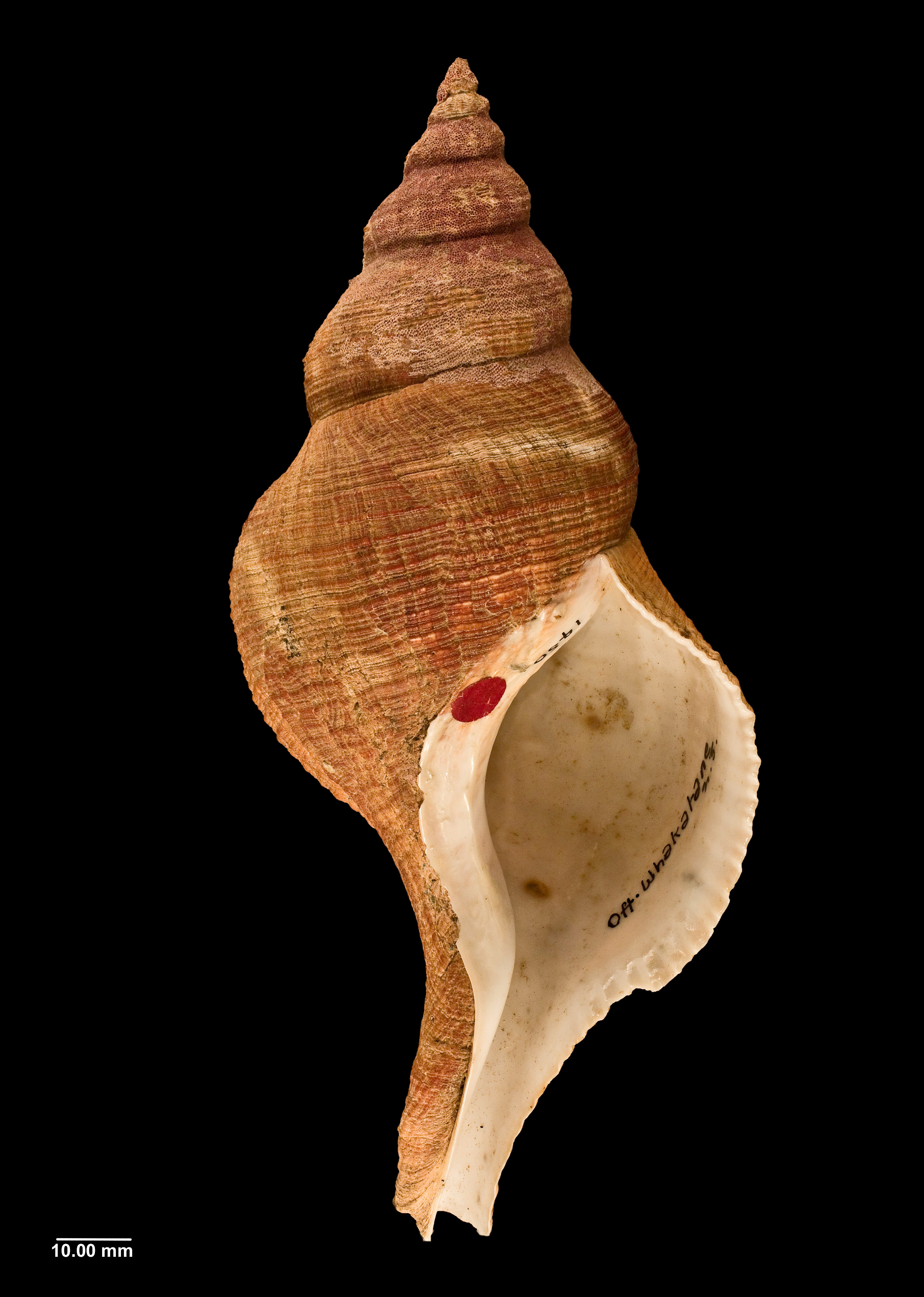

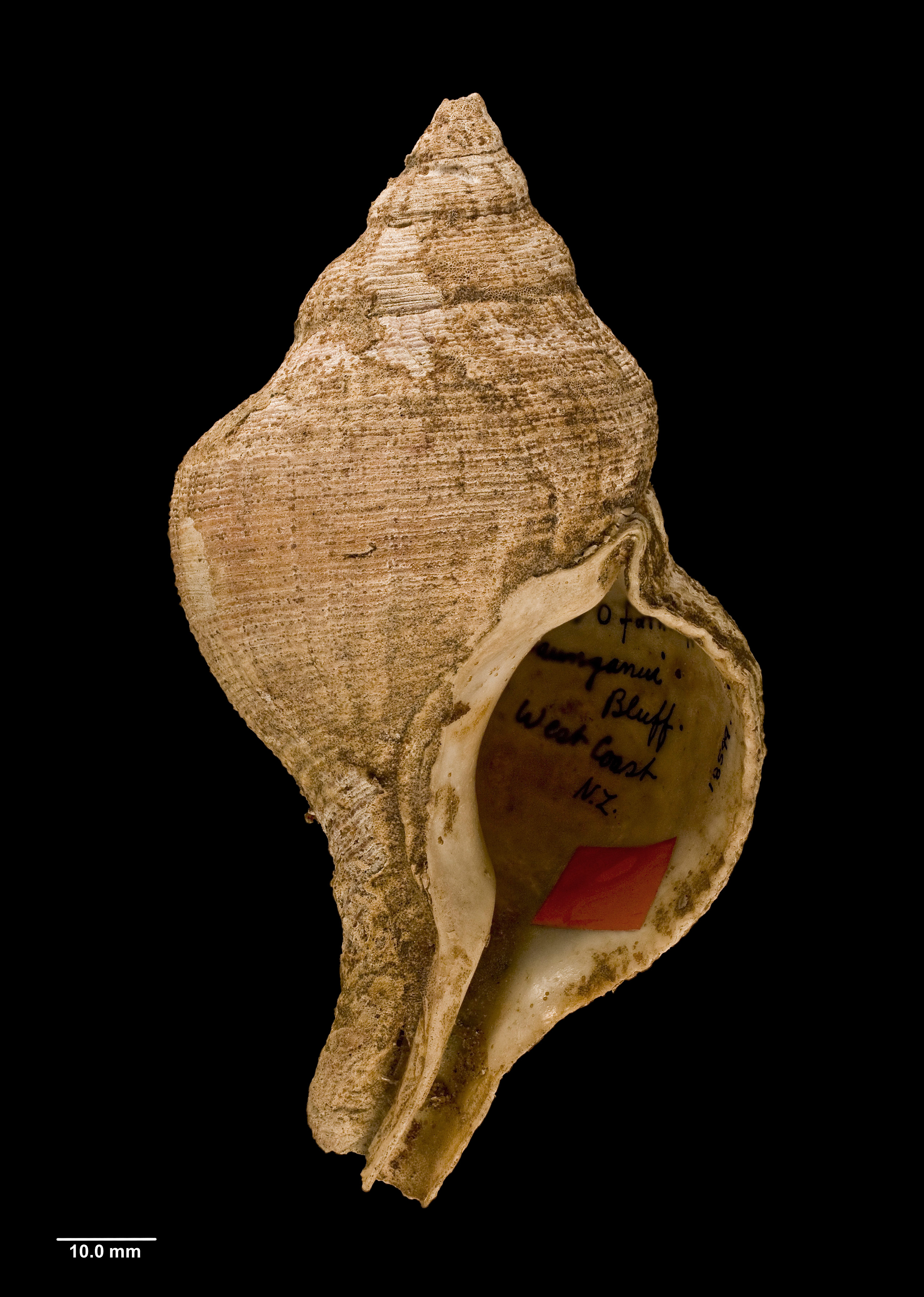

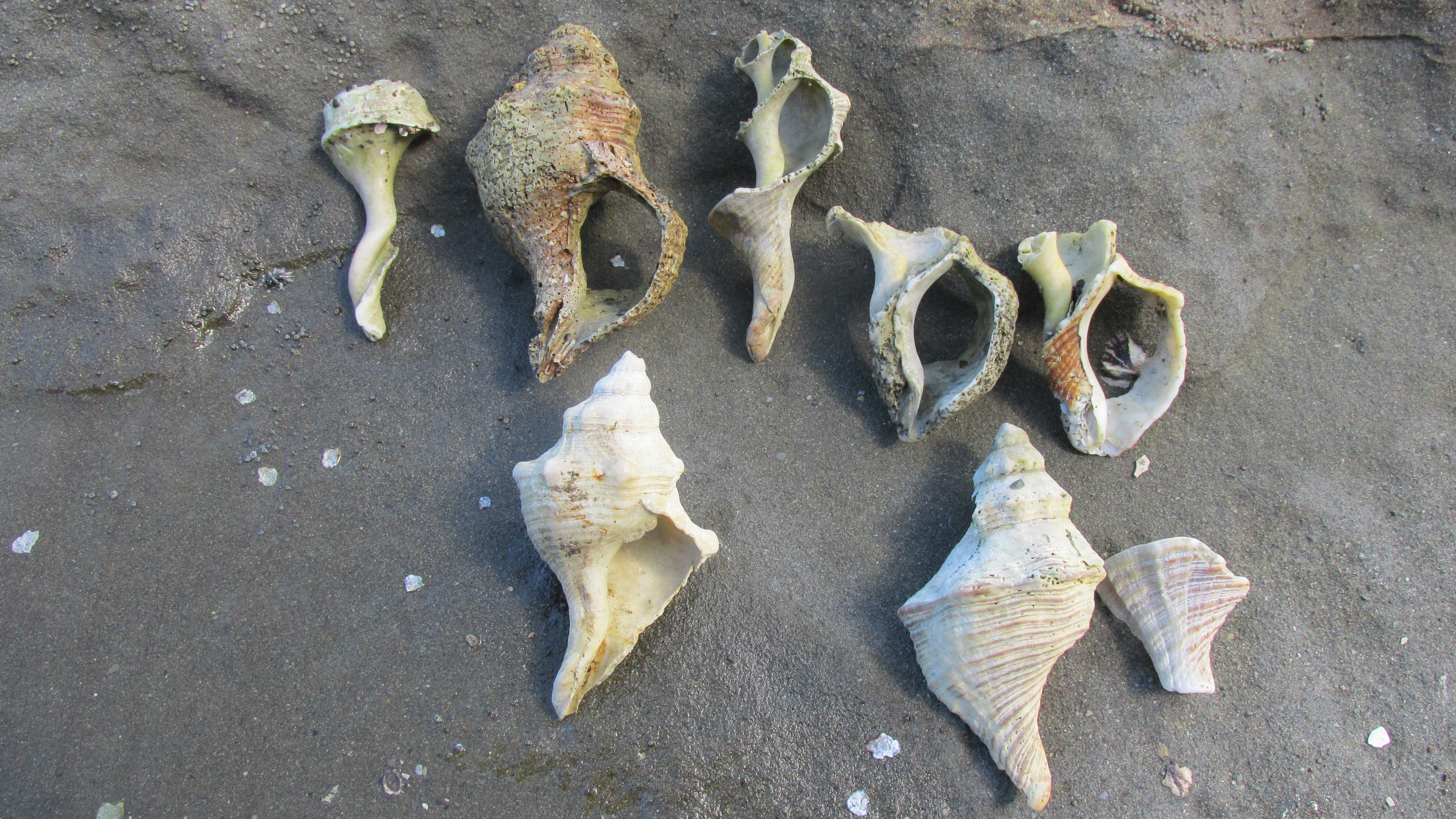
Shells fragments washed ashore at Hobbs Bay, Whangaparaoa

== Distribution ==
Penion sulcatus is endemic to New Zealand. The species is found of the entire North Island and northern South Island coasts. The species has an abundant fossil record in the North Island of New Zealand.

P. sulcatus is benthic and is common on soft-sediments on the continental shelf or within the subtidal rocky shore environment.

== Ecology ==
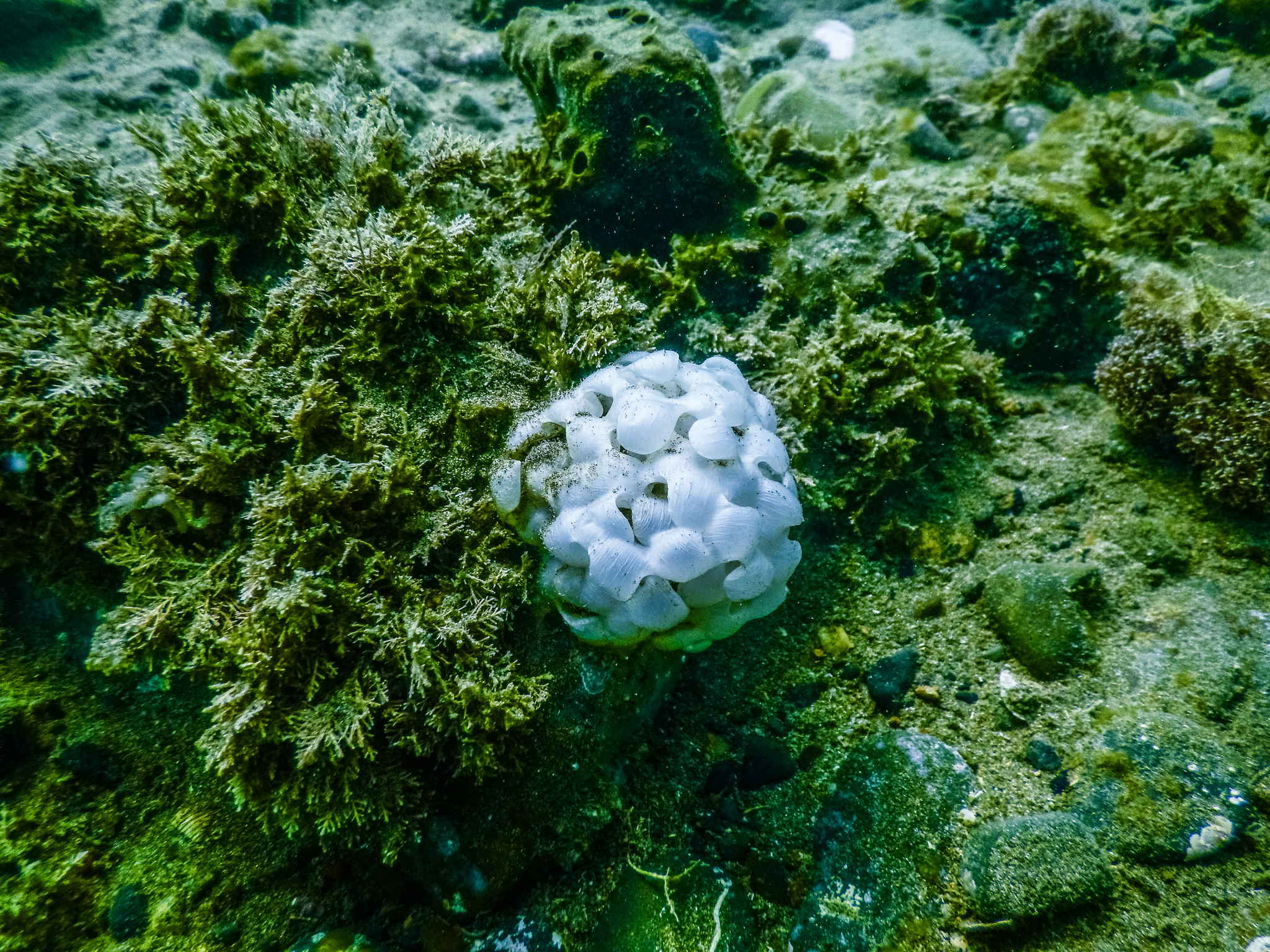
Egg capsules of Penion sulcatus at Kawau Bay, Hauraki Gulf.

Penion sulcatus is a carnivore and is known to feed on mussels and Dosina zelandica zelandica.

== Human use ==
Shells found in middens of historic Māori settlements indicate that P. sulcatus may have been intentionally foraged as a food-source.
