= Fusus clavatus =

Scientific classification
- Kingdom: Animalia
- Phylum: Mollusca
- Class: Gastropoda
- Subclass: Caenogastropoda
- Order: Neogastropoda
- Family: Fasciolariidae
- Genus: Fusus
- Species: F. clavatus

Binomial name
- Fusus clavatus della Chiaje, 1830

Species of gastropod

Fusus clavatus is a species of sea snail, a marine gastropod mollusk in the family Fasciolariidae, the spindle snails, the tulip snails and their allies.

Fusus clavatus is a nomen dubium
