= Fusus pictus =

Scientific classification
- Kingdom: Animalia
- Phylum: Mollusca
- Class: Gastropoda
- Subclass: Caenogastropoda
- Order: Neogastropoda
- Family: Fasciolariidae
- Genus: Fusus
- Species: F. pictus

Binomial name
- Fusus pictus (Turton, 1825)

Synonyms
- Purpura picta Turton, 1825

Species of gastropod

Fusus pictus is a species of sea snail, a marine gastropod mollusk in the family Fasciolariidae, the spindle snails, the tulip snails and their allies.

== Distribution ==
They are distributed in tropical warm waters around the equator.
