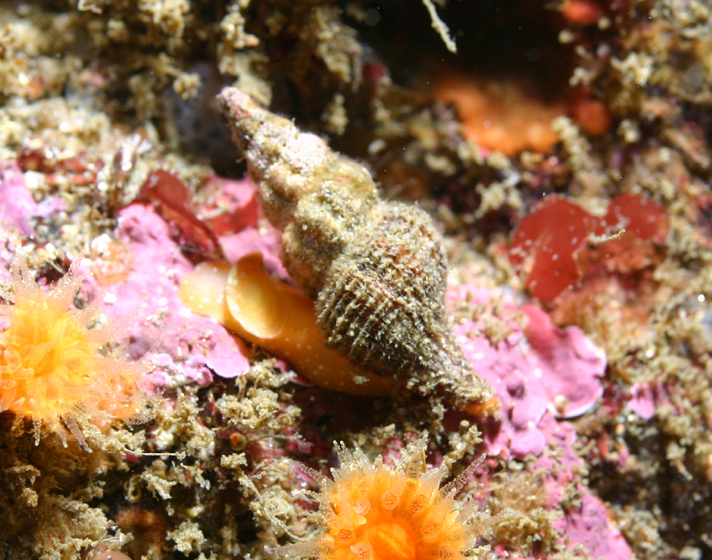
- A live individual of Harfordia robusta

Scientific classification
- Kingdom: Animalia
- Phylum: Mollusca
- Class: Gastropoda
- Subclass: Caenogastropoda
- Order: Neogastropoda
- Family: Fasciolariidae
- Genus: Harfordia
- Species: H. robusta

Binomial name
- Harfordia robusta (Trask, 1855)

Synonyms
- Fusinus monksae Dall, 1915 (Unnecessary nom. nov. for Fusus robustus Trask, 1855, by Dall believed to be preoccupied by F. robustus Beyrich, 1856. ); Fusinus robustus (Trask, 1855); Fusus robustus Trask, 1855; Heilprinia robusta (Trask, 1855)

= Harfordia robusta =

Species of gastropod

Harfordia robusta is a species of sea snail, a marine gastropod mollusk in the family Fasciolariidae, the spindle snails, the tulip snails and their allies.
