= Fusus juvenis =

Scientific classification
- Kingdom: Animalia
- Phylum: Mollusca
- Class: Gastropoda
- Subclass: Caenogastropoda
- Order: Neogastropoda
- Family: Fasciolariidae
- Genus: Fusus
- Species: F. juvenis

Binomial name
- Fusus juvenis Bivona, 1838

Species of gastropod

Fusus juvenis is a species of sea snail, a marine gastropod mollusk in the family Fasciolariidae, the spindle snails, the tulip snails and their allies.
