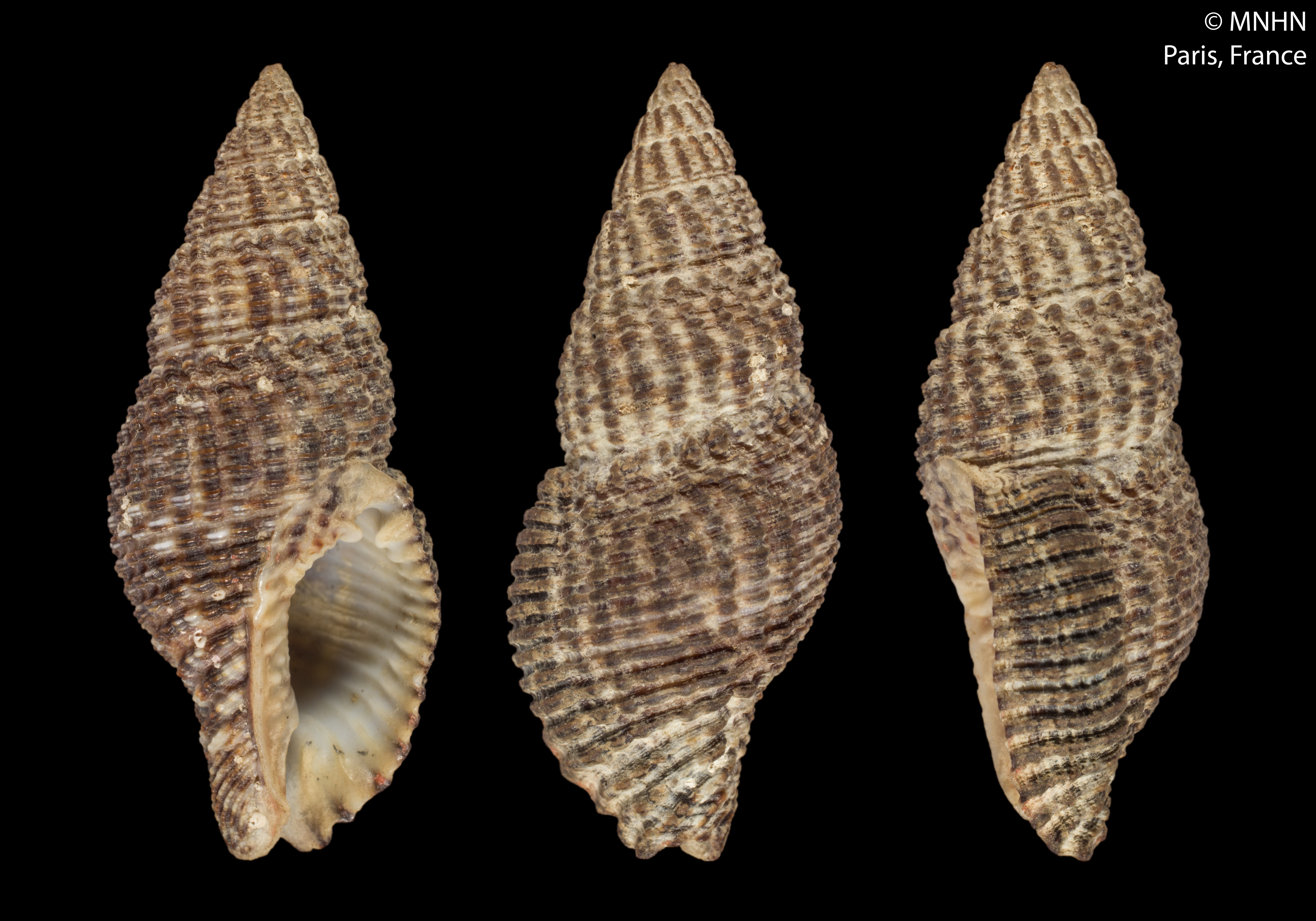
- Shell of Fusus pazi (syntype at MNHN, Paris)

Scientific classification
- Kingdom: Animalia
- Phylum: Mollusca
- Class: Gastropoda
- Subclass: Caenogastropoda
- Order: Neogastropoda
- Family: Fasciolariidae
- Genus: Fusus
- Species: F. pazi

Binomial name
- Fusus pazi Crosse, 1859

= Fusus pazi =

Species of gastropod

Fusus pazi is a species of sea snail, a marine gastropod mollusk in the family Fasciolariidae, the spindle snails, the tulip snails and their allies.

This is a nomen dubium.

== Description ==
The length of the shell attains 40 mm, its diameter is 15 mm.

== Distribution ==
Habitat unknown.
