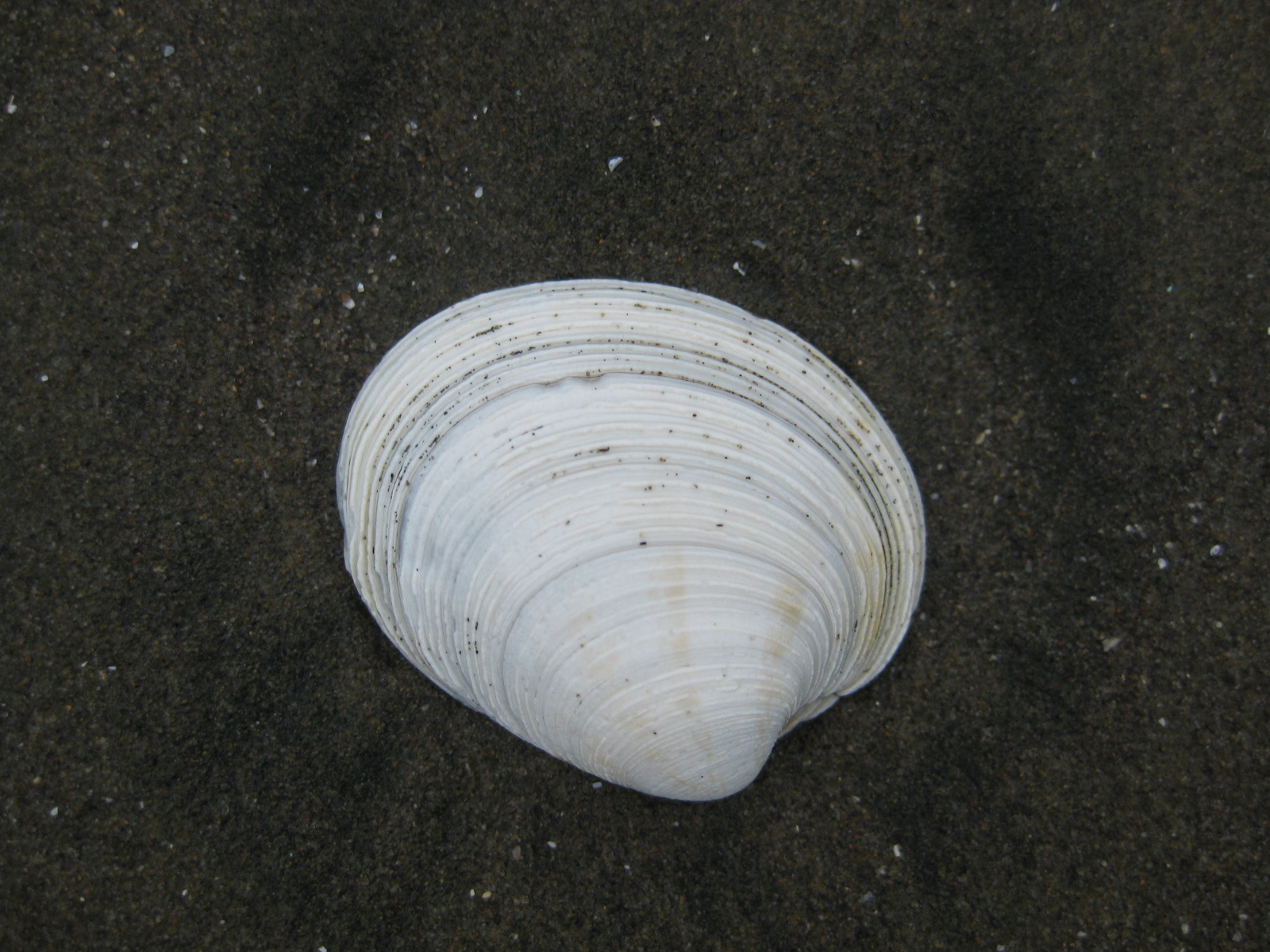
- Dosina mactracea

Scientific classification
- Kingdom: Animalia
- Phylum: Mollusca
- Class: Bivalvia
- Order: Venerida
- Superfamily: Veneroidea
- Family: Veneridae
- Genus: Dosina; Gray, 1835

Species
- See text.

= Dosina =

Genus of bivalves

Dosina is a genus of marine bivalve molluscs in the family Veneridae.

== Species ==
As of October 2021, the following species are accepted in the genus Dosina:

- Dosina firmocosta (Marwick, 1927) †
- Dosina mactracea (Broderip, 1835)
- Dosina marwicki (Laws, 1936) †
- Dosina morgani (Suter, 1917) †
- Dosina occidentalis Ludbrook, 1978 †
- Dosina suboblonga (Marwick, 1927) †
- Dosina uttleyi (Marwick, 1927) †
