= Fusus gracilis =

Scientific classification
- Kingdom: Animalia
- Phylum: Mollusca
- Class: Gastropoda
- Subclass: Caenogastropoda
- Order: Neogastropoda
- Family: Fasciolariidae
- Genus: Fusus
- Species: F. gracilis

Binomial name
- Fusus gracilis Koch, 1845

Species of gastropod

Fusus gracilis is a species of sea snail, a marine gastropod mollusc in the family Fasciolariidae, the spindle and tulip snails.
