= Fusus plicosus =

Scientific classification
- Kingdom: Animalia
- Phylum: Mollusca
- Class: Gastropoda
- Subclass: Caenogastropoda
- Order: Neogastropoda
- Family: Fasciolariidae
- Genus: Fusus
- Species: F. plicosus

Binomial name
- Fusus plicosus (Menke, 1830)

Synonyms
- Buccinum plicosum Menke, 1830

Species of gastropod

Fusus plicosus is a species of sea snail, a marine gastropod mollusk in the family Fasciolariidae, the spindle snails, the tulip snails and their allies.
