= Hesperaptyxis fredbakeri =

Scientific classification
- Kingdom: Animalia
- Phylum: Mollusca
- Class: Gastropoda
- Subclass: Caenogastropoda
- Order: Neogastropoda
- Family: Fasciolariidae
- Genus: Hesperaptyxis
- Species: H. fredbakeri

Binomial name
- Hesperaptyxis fredbakeri (Lowe, 1935)

Synonyms
- Fusinus fredbakeri H. N. Lowe, 1935 (original combination)

Species of gastropod

Hesperaptyxis fredbakeri is a species of sea snail, a marine gastropod mollusc in the family Fasciolariidae, the spindle snails, the tulip snails and their allies.
