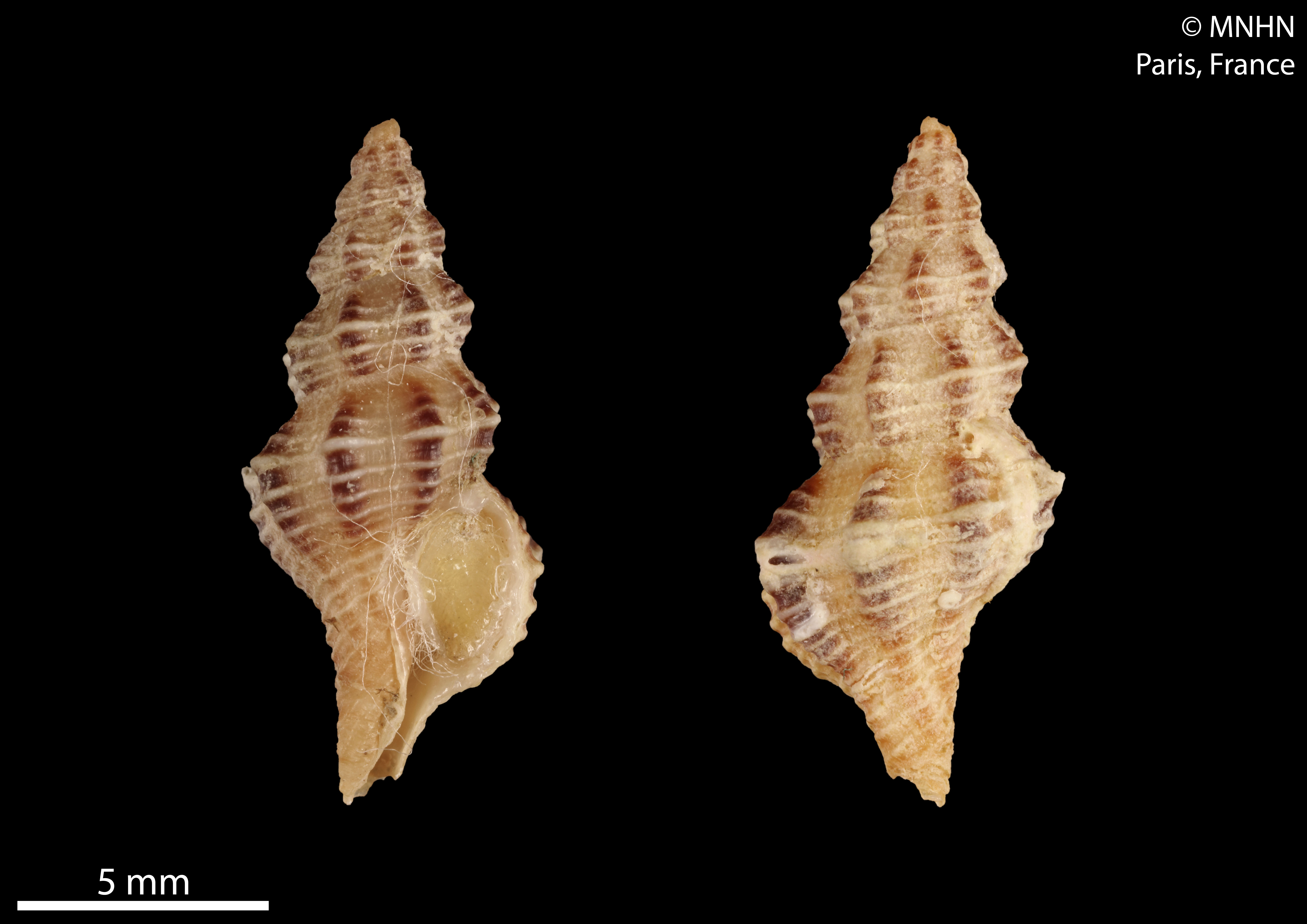
- Shell of Aegeofusinus margaritae

Scientific classification
- Kingdom: Animalia
- Phylum: Mollusca
- Class: Gastropoda
- Subclass: Caenogastropoda
- Order: Neogastropoda
- Superfamily: Buccinoidea
- Family: Fasciolariidae
- Subfamily: Fusininae
- Genus: Aegeofusinus; Russo, 2017

Type species
- Fusinus margaritae Buzzurro & Russo, 2007

Species
- See text

= Aegeofusinus =

Genus of gastropods

Aegeofusinus is a genus of sea snails, marine gastropod mollusks in the subfamily Fusininae of the family Fasciolariidae, the spindle snails, the tulip snails and their allies.

== Species ==
Species within the genus Aegeofusinus include:

- Aegeofusinus angeli (Russo & Angelidis, 2016)
- Aegeofusinus eviae (Buzzurro & Russo, 2007)
- Aegeofusinus margaritae (Buzzurro & Russo, 2007)
- Aegeofusinus patriciae (Russo & Olivieri, 2013)
- Aegeofusinus profetai (Nofroni, 1982)
- Aegeofusinus rolani (Buzzurro & Ovalis, 2005)
