= Aegeofusinus eviae =

Scientific classification
- Kingdom: Animalia
- Phylum: Mollusca
- Class: Gastropoda
- Subclass: Caenogastropoda
- Order: Neogastropoda
- Family: Fasciolariidae
- Genus: Aegeofusinus
- Species: A. eviae

Binomial name
- Aegeofusinus eviae (Buzzurro & Russo, 2007)

Synonyms
- Fusinus eviae Buzzurro & Russo, 2007 (original combination)

Species of gastropod

Aegeofusinus eviae is a species of sea snail, a marine gastropod mollusk in the family Fasciolariidae, the spindle snails, the tulip snails and their allies.
