= Aegeofusinus profetai =

Scientific classification
- Kingdom: Animalia
- Phylum: Mollusca
- Class: Gastropoda
- Subclass: Caenogastropoda
- Order: Neogastropoda
- Family: Fasciolariidae
- Genus: Aegeofusinus
- Species: A. profetai

Binomial name
- Aegeofusinus profetai (Nofroni, 1982)

Synonyms
- Fusinus profetai Nofroni, 1982 (original combination); Latirus profetai (Nofroni, 1982)

Species of gastropod

Aegeofusinus profetai is a species of sea snail, a marine gastropod mollusk in the family Fasciolariidae, the spindle snails, the tulip snails and their allies.

== Description ==
The shell size varies between 10 mm and 14 mm.

== Distribution ==
This species occurs in European waters and in the Mediterranean Sea off Spain and Greece.
