= Hesperaptyxis =

Scientific classification
- Kingdom: Animalia
- Phylum: Mollusca
- Class: Gastropoda
- Subclass: Caenogastropoda
- Order: Neogastropoda
- Superfamily: Buccinoidea
- Family: Fasciolariidae
- Genus: Hesperaptyxis; Vermeij & Snyder, 2016

Type species
- Turbinella cinerea Reeve, 1847

Genus of gastropods

Hesperaptyxis is a genus of sea snails, marine gastropod mollusks in the subfamily Fusininae of the family Fasciolariidae, the spindle snails and tulip snails.

== Species ==
- Hesperaptyxis ambustus (Gould, 1853)
- Hesperaptyxis cinereus (Reeve, 1847)
- Hesperaptyxis felipensis (H. N. Lowe, 1935)
- Hesperaptyxis fredbakeri (H. N. Lowe, 1935)
- Hesperaptyxis luteopictus (Dall, 1877)
- † Hesperaptyxis meridionalis Callomon & Snyder, 2017
- Hesperaptyxis negusi Snyder & Vermeij, 2016
