= Pseudofusus =

Scientific classification
- Kingdom: Animalia
- Phylum: Mollusca
- Class: Gastropoda
- Subclass: Caenogastropoda
- Order: Neogastropoda
- Superfamily: Buccinoidea
- Family: Fasciolariidae
- Genus: Pseudofusus; Rafinesque, 1815

Type species
- Murex rostratus Olivi, 1792

Synonyms
- Aegeofusinus Russo, 2017 junior subjective synonym; † Carinofusus Ceulemans, Landau & Van Dingenen, 2014 ·; Fusus (Pseudofusus) Monterosato, 1884

Genus of gastropods

Pseudofusus is a genus of small to large sea snails, marine gastropod molluscs in the subfamily Fusininae of the family Fasciolariidae, the spindle snails and tulip snails.

== Species ==
- † Pseudofusus acuticostatus (Speyer, 1860)
- † Pseudofusus affinis (Bronn, 1831)
- Pseudofusus albacarinoides (Hadorn, Afonso & Rolán, 2009)
- Pseudofusus alternatus (Buzzurro & Russo, 2007)
- Pseudofusus angeli (Russo & Angelidis, 2016)
- Pseudofusus buzzurroi (Prkić & Russo, 2008)
- Pseudofusus cinctus (Bellardi & Michelotti, 1840)
- Pseudofusus clarae (Russo & Renda, 2013)
- Pseudofusus corallinus (Russo & Germanà, 2014)
- Pseudofusus cretellai (Buzzurro & Russo, 2008)
- Pseudofusus dimassai (Buzzurro & Russo, 2007)
- Pseudofusus dimitrii (Buzzurro & Ovalis, 2007)
- Pseudofusus eviae (Buzzurro & Russo, 2007)
- Pseudofusus fioritae (Russo & Pagli, 2019)
- Pseudofusus insularis (Russo & Calascibetta, 2018)
- Pseudofusus labronicus Monterosato, 1884
- Pseudofusus margaritae (Buzzurro & Russo, 2007)
- † Pseudofusus neogenicus (Cossmann, 1901)
- Pseudofusus parvulus Monterosato, 1884
- Pseudofusus patriciae (Russo & Olivieri, 2013)
- Pseudofusus profetai (Nofroni, 1982)
- Pseudofusus pulchellus (R. A. Philippi, 1840)
- Pseudofusus raouli (Lozouet, 2015)
- Pseudofusus raricostatus (Del Prete, 1883)
- Pseudofusus rolani (Buzzurro & Ovalis, 2005)
- Pseudofusus rostratus (Olivi, 1792)
- Pseudofusus rusticulus (Monterosato, 1880)
- Pseudofusus ventimigliae (Russo & Renda, 2013)

Synonyms

- Pseudofusus adustus Coen, 1914: synonym of Pseudofusus pulchellus (R. A. Philippi, 1840)
- † Pseudofusus austriacus (R. Hoernes & Auinger, 1890): synonym of Pseudofusus rostratus (Olivi, 1792)
- Pseudofusus gigliolii Monterosato, 1890: synonym of Pseudofusus rostratus (Olivi, 1792)
- Pseudofusus locardi Pallary, 1904: synonym of Pseudofusus rostratus (Olivi, 1792)
- Pseudofusus rubicundus (Nardo, 1847): synonym of Pseudofusus rostratus (Olivi, 1792) (dubious synonym)
