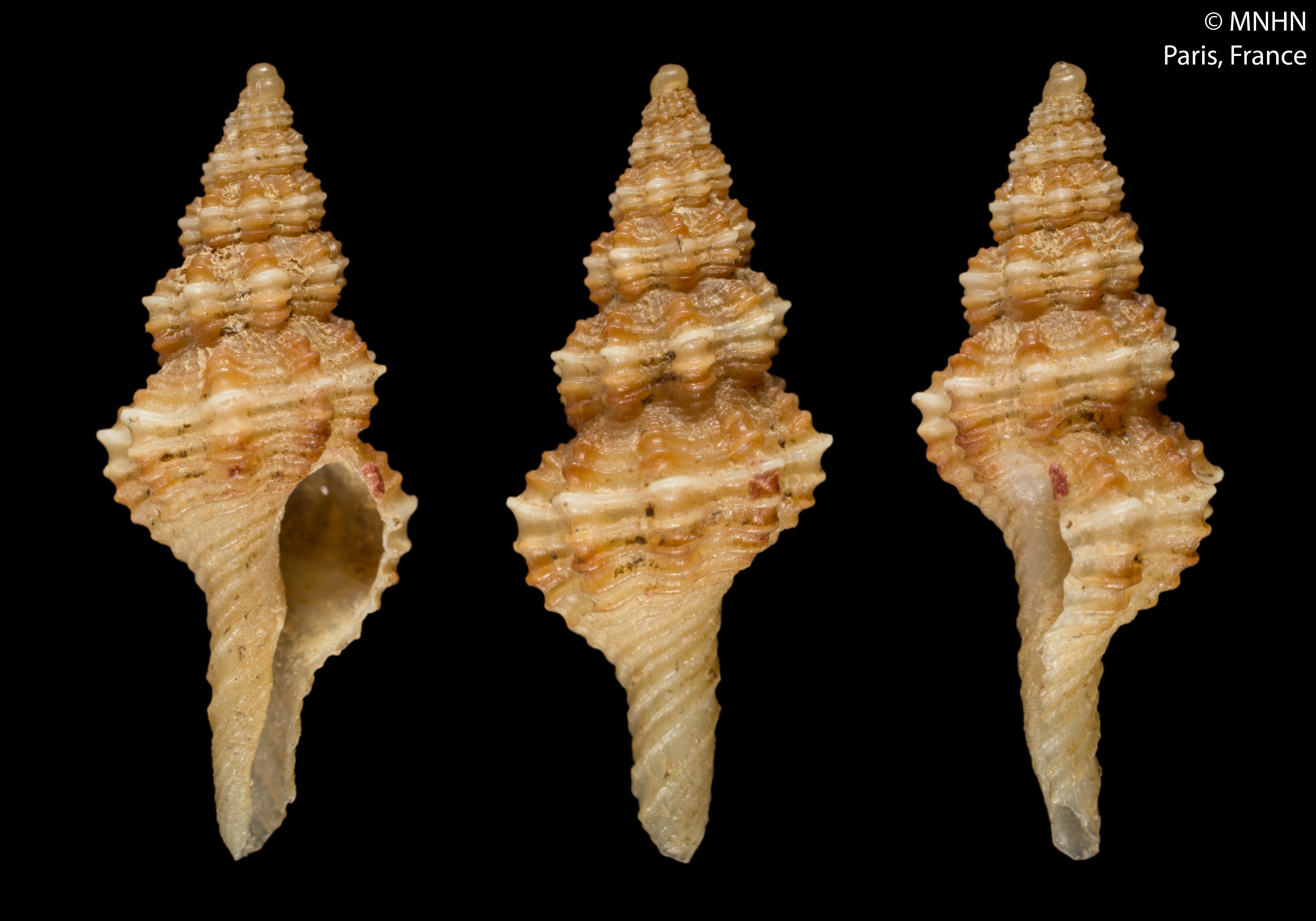
- Shell of Pseudofusus rostratus (holotype at MNHN, Paris)

Scientific classification
- Kingdom: Animalia
- Phylum: Mollusca
- Class: Gastropoda
- Subclass: Caenogastropoda
- Order: Neogastropoda
- Family: Fasciolariidae
- Genus: Pseudofusus
- Species: P. rostratus

Binomial name
- Pseudofusus rostratus (Olivi, 1792)

Synonyms
- Fusinus carinatus Roemer, 1836; Fusinus rostratus (Olivi, 1792); Fusinus sanctaeluciae (von Salis-Marschlins, 1793); Fusus (Pseudofusus) dalpiazi Coen, 1918; Fusus bengasiensis Sturany, 1896; Fusus caelatus Reeve, 1847; Fusus carinulatus Locard, 1886; Fusus fragosus Reeve, 1848; Fusus lateroides (Monterosato, 1891); Fusus rissoianus Locard, 1891 (dubious synonym); Fusus rostratus (Olivi, 1792); Fusus rostratus var. carinata del Prete, 1883; Fusus rostratus var. subcarinata del Prete, 1883; Fusus strigosus Lamarck, 1822; † Gracilipurpura austriaca (R. Hoernes & Auinger, 1890) superseded combination; Gracilipurpura rostrata (Olivi, 1792) superseded combination; Murex rostratus Olivi, 1792 (original combination); Murex rubicundus Nardo, 1847 ·; Murex sanctaeluciae Salis Marschlins, 1793; Pseudofusus gigliolii Monterosato, 1890; Pseudofusus locardi Pallary, 1904; Pseudofusus rostratus (Olivi, 1792); Pseudofusus rostratus var. kobeltiana Monterosato, 1890; Pseudofusus rostratus var. lateroides Monterosato, 1891; Pseudofusus rostratus var. sollieri Monterosato, 1890; Pseudofusus rubicundus Monterosato, 1884 (dubious synonym); Trophon rostratus (Olivi, 1792)

= Pseudofusus rostratus =

Species of gastropod

Pseudofusus rostratus is a species of sea snail, a marine gastropod mollusc in the family Fasciolariidae, the spindle snails, the tulip snails and their allies.

== Description ==
The length of the shell attains 15.7 mm.

== Distribution ==
This species occurs in the Atlantic Ocean off Morocco.
