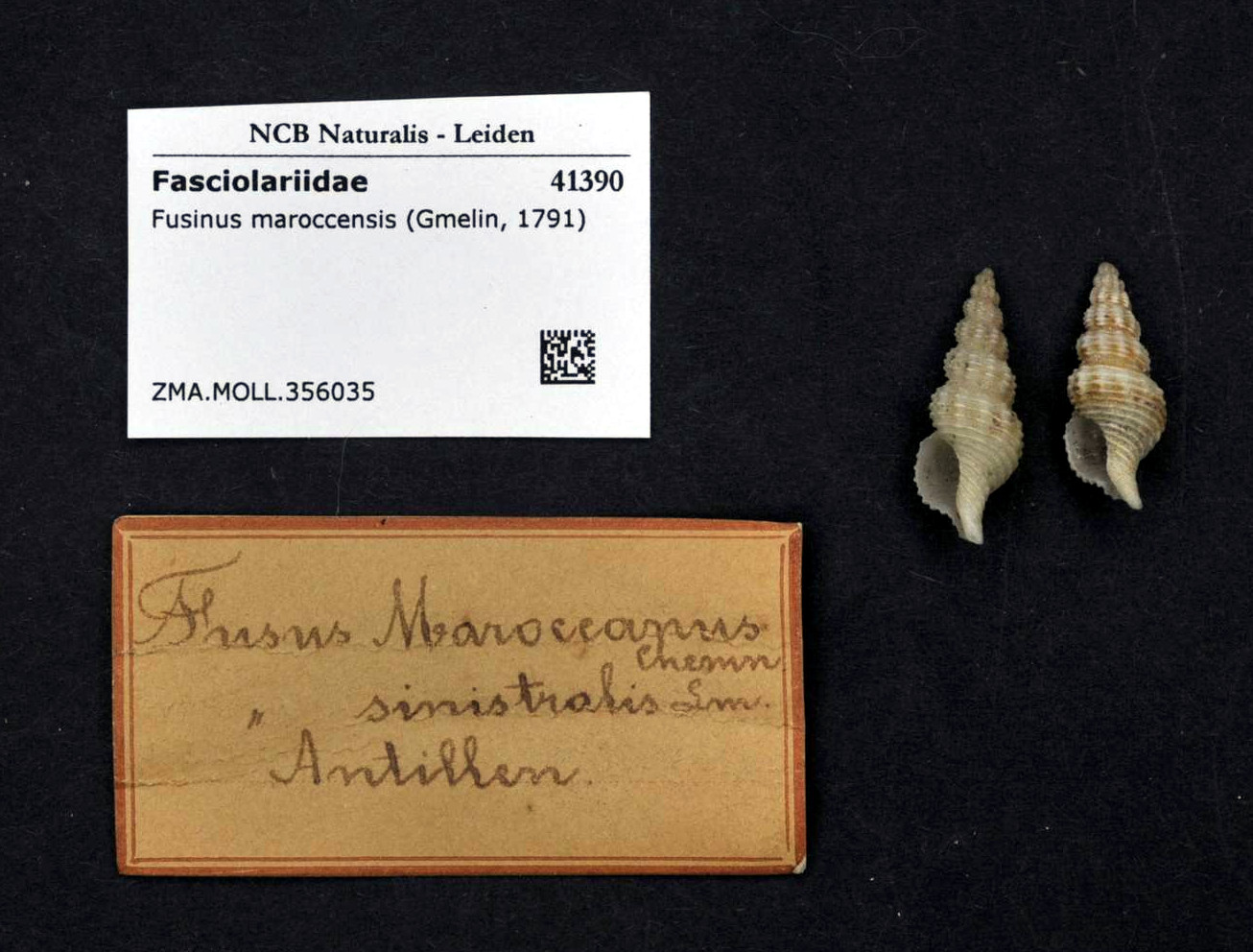
- Two Fusinus maroccensis shells. Image from the Naturalis Biodiversity Center

Scientific classification
- Kingdom: Animalia
- Phylum: Mollusca
- Class: Gastropoda
- Subclass: Caenogastropoda
- Order: Neogastropoda
- Family: Fasciolariidae
- Genus: Fusinus
- Species: F. maroccensis

Binomial name
- Fusinus maroccensis (Gmelin, 1791)

Synonyms
- Buccinum scaevolum Meuschen, 1787; Fusus maroccensis (Gmelin, 1791); Murex maroccensis Gmelin, 1791; Sinistralia maroccensis (Gmelin, 1791); Fusus elegans Reeve, 1848; Fusus maroccanus Reeve, 1848

= Fusinus maroccensis =

Species of gastropod

Fusinus maroccensis is a species of sea snail, a marine gastropod mollusk in the family Fasciolariidae, the spindle snails, the tulip snails and their allies.

== Distribution ==
Fusinus maroccensis is found mainly in European waters.
