= Fusinus zebrinus =

Scientific classification
- Kingdom: Animalia
- Phylum: Mollusca
- Class: Gastropoda
- Subclass: Caenogastropoda
- Order: Neogastropoda
- Family: Fasciolariidae
- Genus: Fusinus
- Species: F. zebrinus

Binomial name
- Fusinus zebrinus Odhner, 1923

Species of gastropod

Fusinus zebrinus is a species of sea snail. It is a marine gastropod mollusc in the family Fasciolariidae (spindle snails, tulip snails and their allies).
