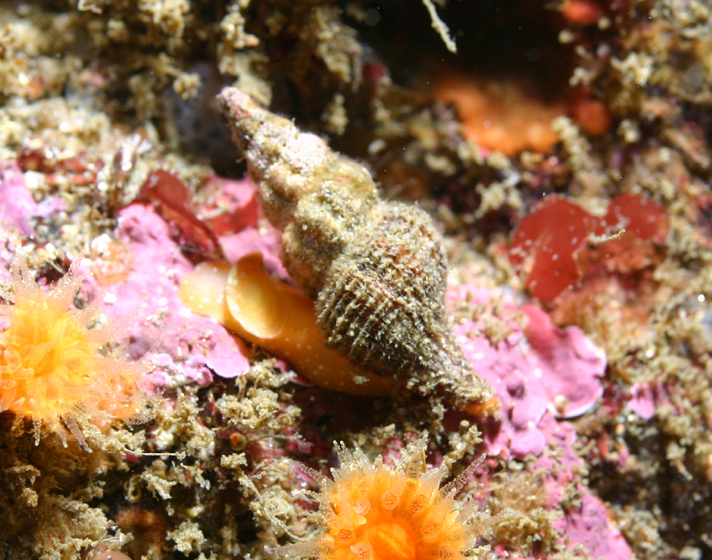

Scientific classification
- Kingdom: Animalia
- Phylum: Mollusca
- Class: Gastropoda
- Subclass: Caenogastropoda
- Order: Neogastropoda
- Superfamily: Buccinoidea
- Family: Fasciolariidae
- Genus: Harfordia; Dall, 1921

Type species
- Fusus harfordii Stearns, 1871

= Harfordia (gastropod) =

Genus of gastropods

Harfordia is a genus of sea snails, marine gastropod mollusks in the subfamily Fusininae of the family Fasciolariidae, the spindle snails, the tulip snails and their allies.

== Species ==
Species within the genus Harfordia include:

- † Harfordia arnoldi (Cossmann, 1903)
- Harfordia chucksnelli Callomon & Snyder, 2017
- Harfordia harfordii (Stearns, 1871)
- Harfordia mcleani Callomon & Snyder, 2017
- Harfordia robusta (Trask, 1855)
