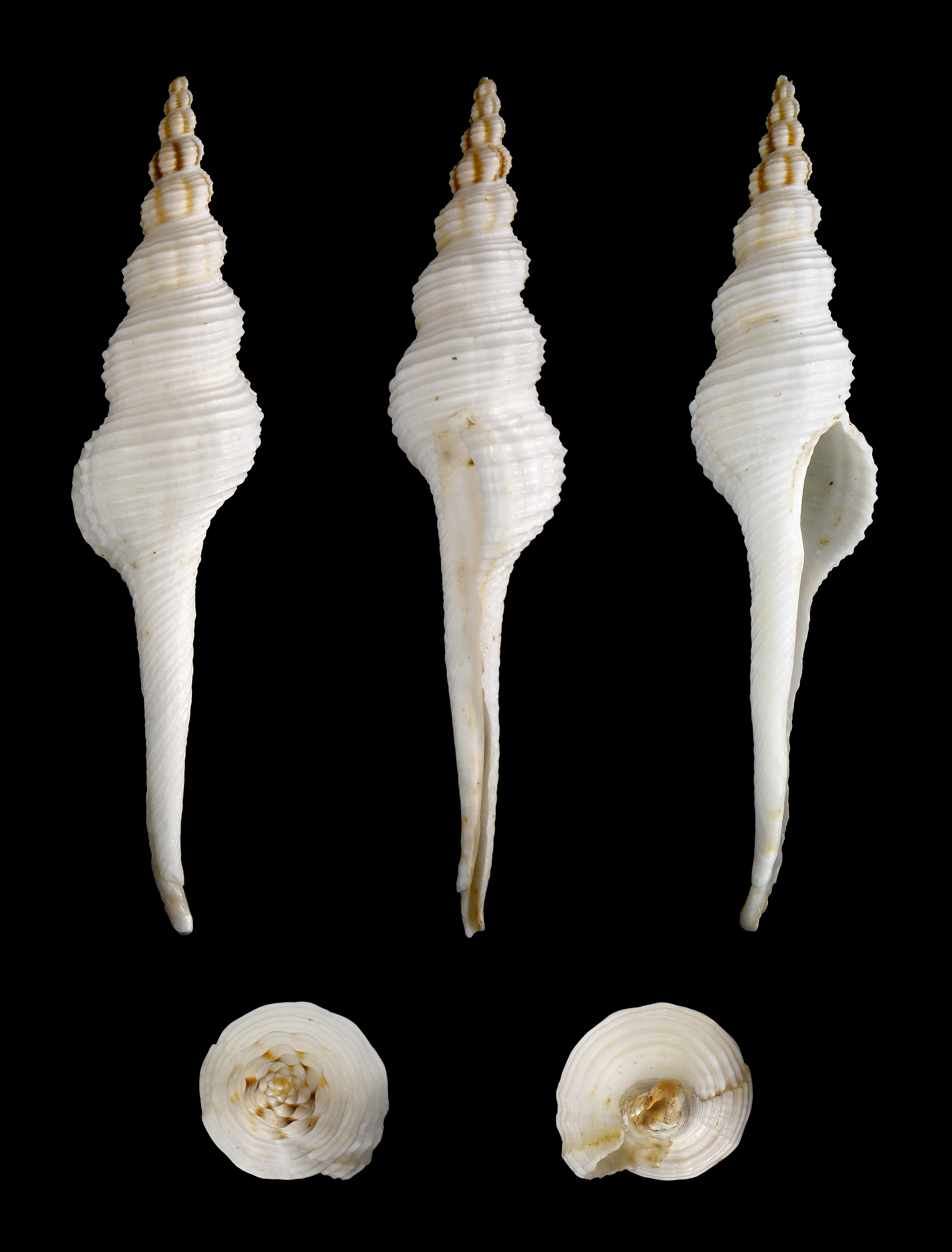
- Five views of a shell of Fusinus colus

Scientific classification
- Kingdom: Animalia
- Phylum: Mollusca
- Class: Gastropoda
- Subclass: Caenogastropoda
- Order: Neogastropoda
- Family: Fasciolariidae
- Genus: Fusinus
- Species: F. colus

Binomial name
- Fusinus colus (Linnaeus, 1758)

Synonyms
- Buccinum toreuma Martyn, 1784; Colus boardmani Iredale, 1930; Colus longicauda (Lamarck, 1801); Fusinus longicauda (Lamarck, 1801); Fusinus toreuma (Martyn, 1784); Fusus colus (Linnaeus, 1758); Fusus longicauda Lamarck, 1801; Fusus longirostris Schumacher, 1817; Fusus toreuma Deshayes, 1843; Fusus tuberculatus Lamarck, 1822; Murex colus Linnaeus, 1758

= Fusinus colus =

Species of gastropod

Fusinus colus, common name the Distaff spindle or Long-tailed Spindle, is a species of sea snail, a marine gastropod mollusk in the family Fasciolariidae, the spindle snails, the tulip snails and their allies.

== Distribution ==
This species is present in the Indian Ocean and in the western and central Pacific Ocean, from East Africa to Melanesia, southern Japan, and southern Queensland.

== Habitat ==
These sea snails are common in coastal waters at depths of 5 to 40 m. They inhabit littoral and the tidal zone and prefer sandy bottoms. They feed on benthic invertebrates.

== Description ==
The size of an adult shell can reach 75–200 millimetres (3.0–7.9 in). These shells are thick, long, biconic, spindle-shaped, with many spiral ribs, grooves and nodules. The spire is elongated. The siphonal canal is very long. The outer surface is usually whitish, but may be yellowish, brown or reddish in color.

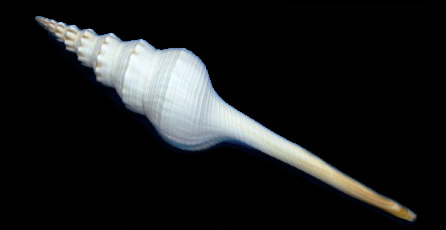
Shell of Fusinus colus

== Bibliography ==
- A. G Hinton – Guide to shells of Papua New Guinea: 68 colour plates illustrating over 1,450 individual shells representing 950 distinct species Paperback
- Arianna Fulvo and Roberto Nistri (2005). 350 coquillages du monde entier. Delachaux et Niestlé (Paris) : 256 p. (ISBN 2-603-01374-2)
- Callomon P. & Snyder M.A. (2007). On the genus Fusinus in Japan III: Nine further species, with type selections. Venus 66(1–2): 19–47.
- Cornelis Swennen and Robert Moolenbeek – The Molluscs of the southern Gulf of Thailand
- Drivas, J. & M. Jay (1988) Coquillages de La Réunion et de l'île Maurice
- Linnaeus C. 1758. Systema Naturae per regna tria naturae, secundum classes, ordines, genera, species, cum characteribus, differentiis, synonymis, locis. Editio decima, reformata Vermes. Testacea. str. 753. Holmiae. (Salvius).
- Marais J.P. & R.N. Kilburn (2010) Fasciolariidae. pp. 106–137, in: Marais A.P. & Seccombe A.D. (eds), Identification guide to the seashells of South Africa. Volume 1. Groenkloof: Centre for Molluscan Studies. 376 pp.
