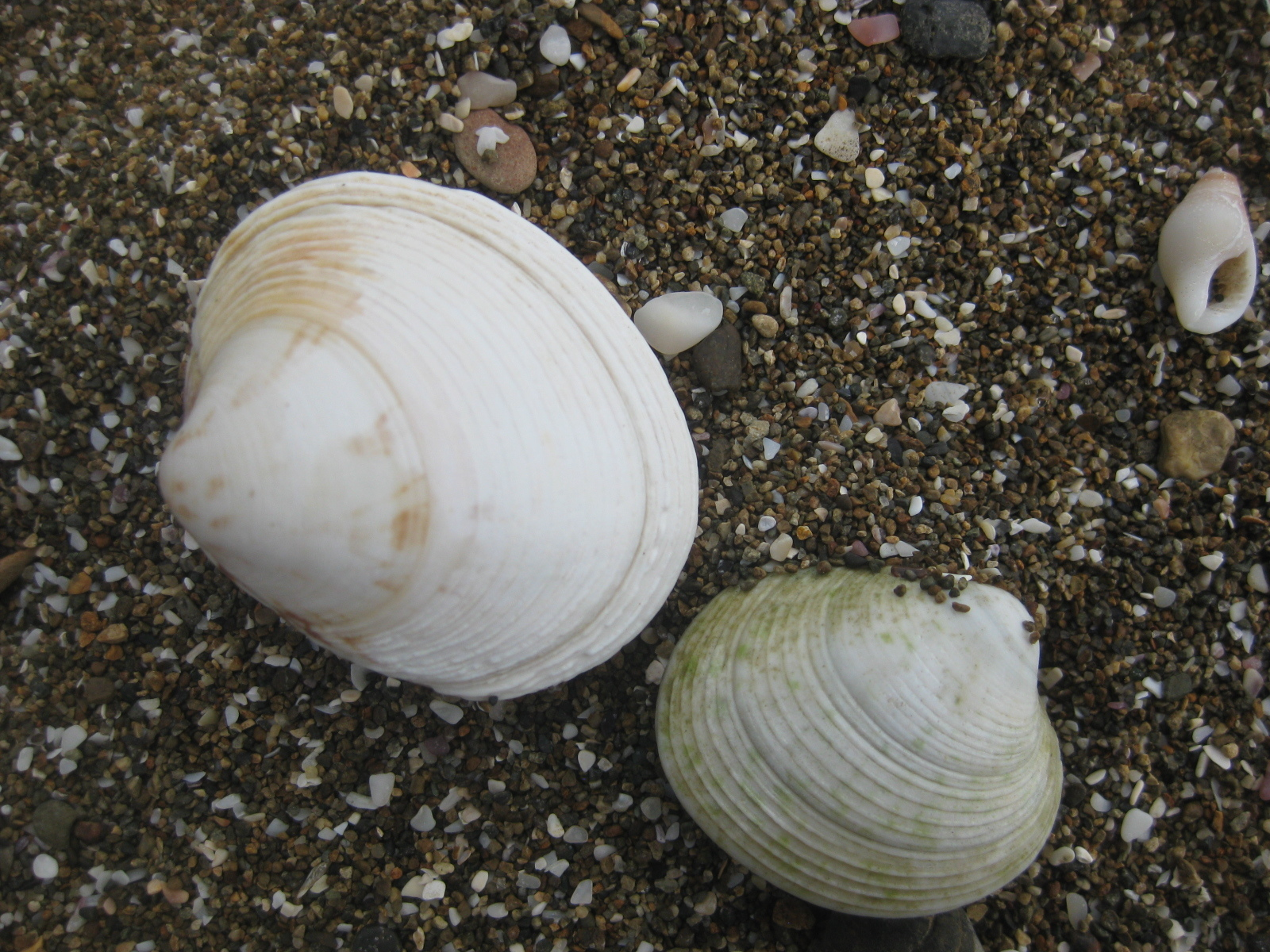

Scientific classification
- Kingdom: Animalia
- Phylum: Mollusca
- Class: Bivalvia
- Order: Venerida
- Family: Veneridae
- Genus: Dosina
- Species: D. mactracea

Binomial name
- Dosina mactracea (Broderip, 1835)

Synonyms
- Chione crebra Hutton, 1873; Dosina crebra (Hutton, 1873); Dosina oblonga Gray, 1843; Dosina zelandica Gray, 1835; Dosinia mactracea (Broderip, 1835) (misspelling of Dosina); Dosinia oblonga (Gray, 1843); Dosinia zelandica Gray, 1835 (misspelling of Dosina); Venus eburnea Reeve, 1863; Venus mactracea Broderip, 1835 (original combination)

= Dosina mactracea =

Species of mollusc

Dosina mactracea is a species of marine bivalve mollusc in the family Veneridae. It occurs in the waters off New Zealand.
