= Harfordia harfordii =

Scientific classification
- Kingdom: Animalia
- Phylum: Mollusca
- Class: Gastropoda
- Subclass: Caenogastropoda
- Order: Neogastropoda
- Family: Fasciolariidae
- Genus: Harfordia
- Species: H. harfordii

Binomial name
- Harfordia harfordii (Stearns, 1871)

Synonyms
- Fusinus harfordii (Stearns, 1871); Fusus (Chrysodomus) harfordii Stearns, 1871 (basionym); Fusus harfordii Stearns, 1871

Species of gastropod

Harfordia harfordii is a species of sea snail, a marine gastropod mollusk in the family Fasciolariidae, the spindle snails, the tulip snails and their allies.

== Description ==
The soft parts of living specimens give off a luminescent pinkish glow.

== Distribution ==
Hope Island, British Columbia to California.
