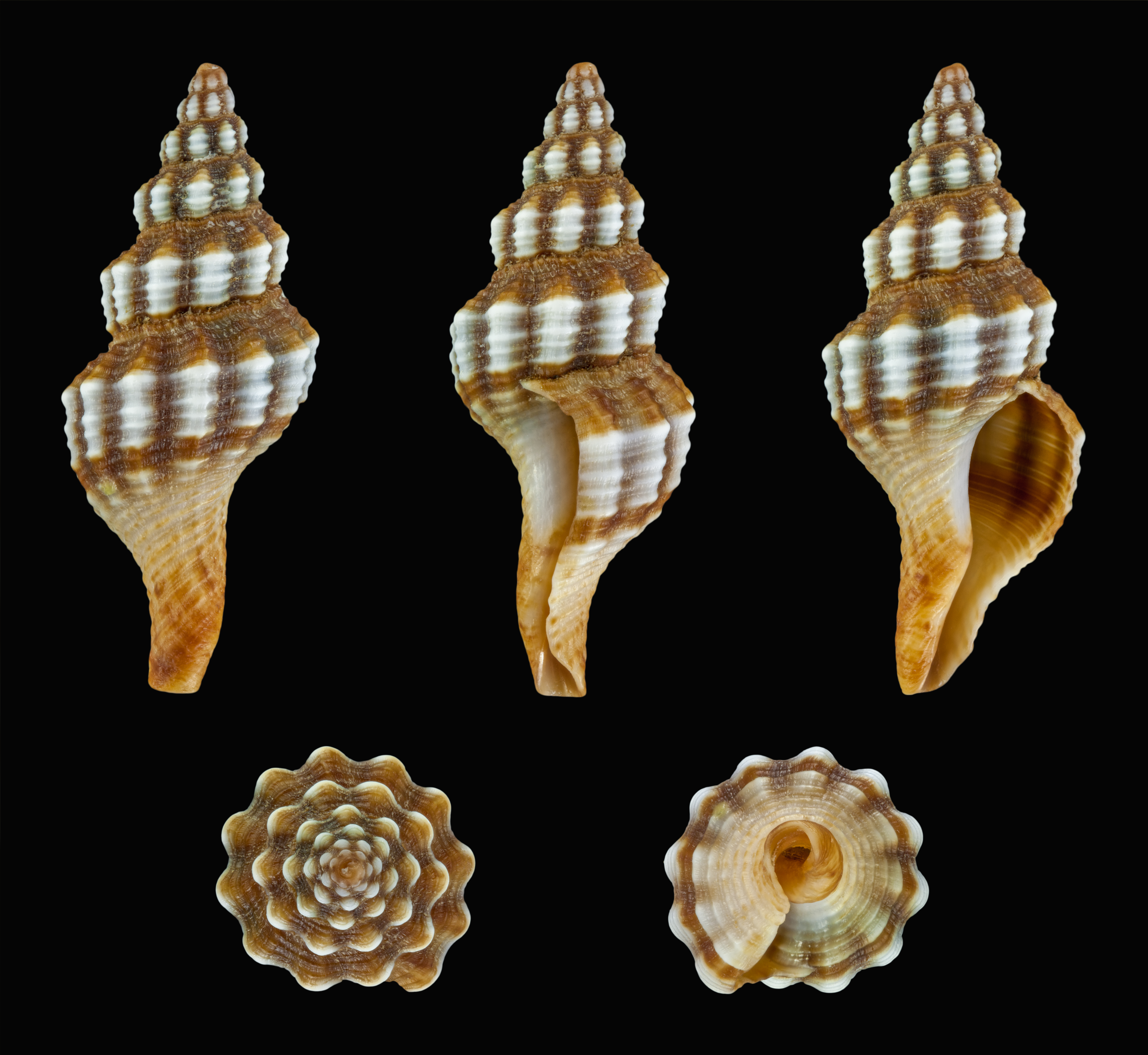
- A shell of Aptyxis syracusana

Scientific classification
- Kingdom: Animalia
- Phylum: Mollusca
- Class: Gastropoda
- Subclass: Caenogastropoda
- Order: Neogastropoda
- Family: Fasciolariidae
- Genus: Aptyxis
- Species: A. syracusana

Binomial name
- Aptyxis syracusana (Linnaeus, 1758)

Synonyms
- Aptyxis syracusanus (Linnaeus, 1758); Aptyxis syracusanus var. abbreviata Coen, 1933; Aptyxis syracusanus var. fasciolarioides Monterosato, 1878; Fusinus rissoianus (Locard, 1892); Fusinus syracusanus (Linnaeus, 1758); Fusinus syracusanus var. rissoianus Locard, 1892; Fusinus syracusanus var. rubra Scacchi, 1836; Fusus syracusanus (Linnaeus, 1758); Latirus (Aptyxis) syracusanus (Linnaeus, 1758); Murex fortis Risso, 1826; Murex syracusanus Linnaeus, 1758 (original combination)

= Aptyxis syracusana =

Species of gastropod

Aptyxis syracusana, common name Syracusan spindle shell, is a species of sea snail, a marine gastropod mollusc in the family Fasciolariidae, the spindle snails, the tulip snails and their allies.

== Description ==
The shell of an adult Aptyxis syracusana can be as large as 30–60 millimetres (1.2–2.4 in).

== Distribution ==
This species is native to the Mediterranean Sea and Canary Islands.
