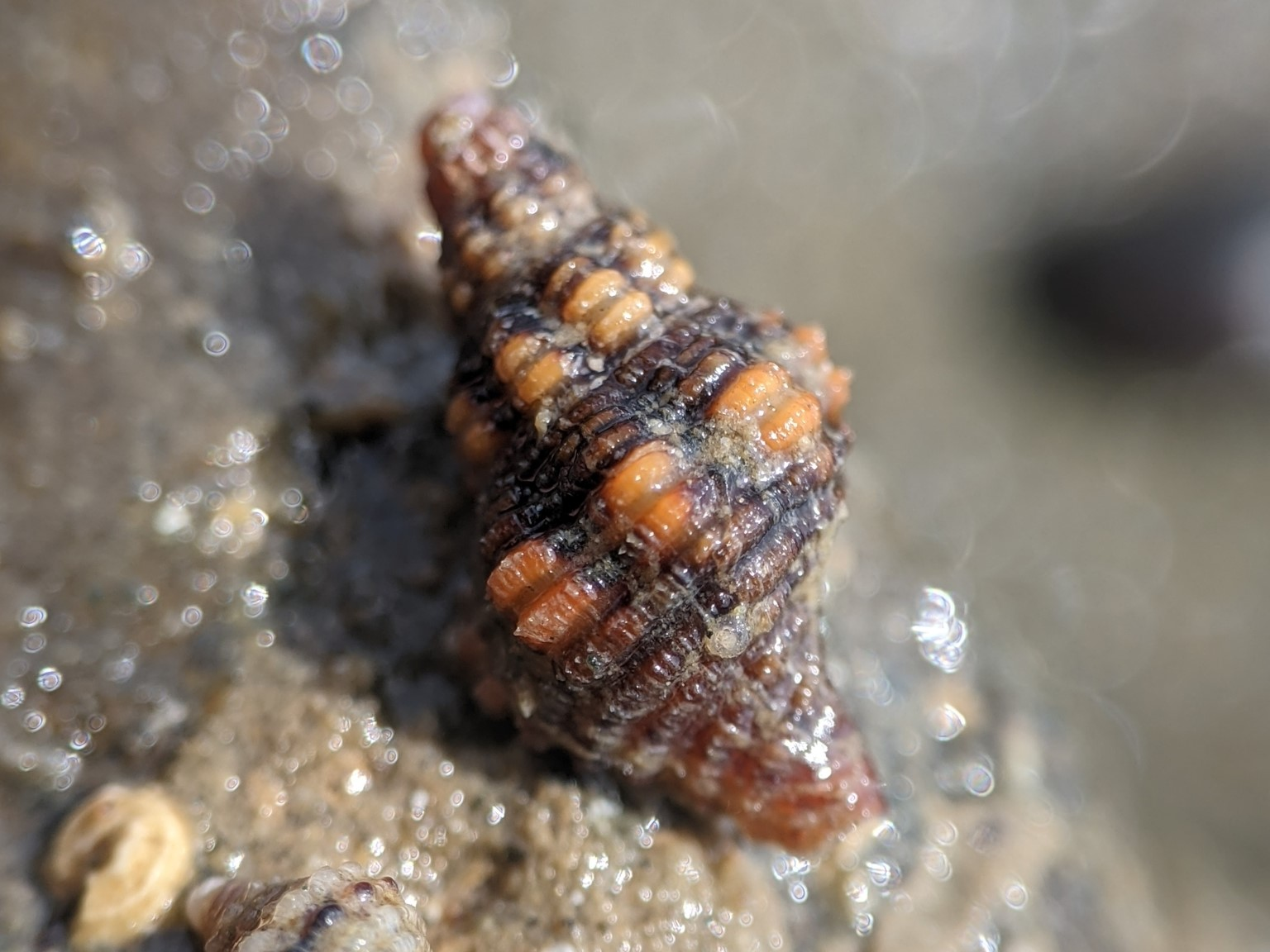

Scientific classification
- Kingdom: Animalia
- Phylum: Mollusca
- Class: Gastropoda
- Subclass: Caenogastropoda
- Order: Neogastropoda
- Family: Fasciolariidae
- Genus: Hesperaptyxis
- Species: H. luteopictus

Binomial name
- Hesperaptyxis luteopictus (Dall, 1887)

Synonyms
- Aptyxis luteopictus (Dall, 1877); Fusinus luteopictus (Dall, 1877); Fusus luteopictus Dall, 1887

= Hesperaptyxis luteopictus =

Species of gastropod

Hesperaptyxis luteopictus is a species of sea snail, a marine gastropod mollusk in the family Fasciolariidae, the spindle snails, the tulip snails and their allies.
