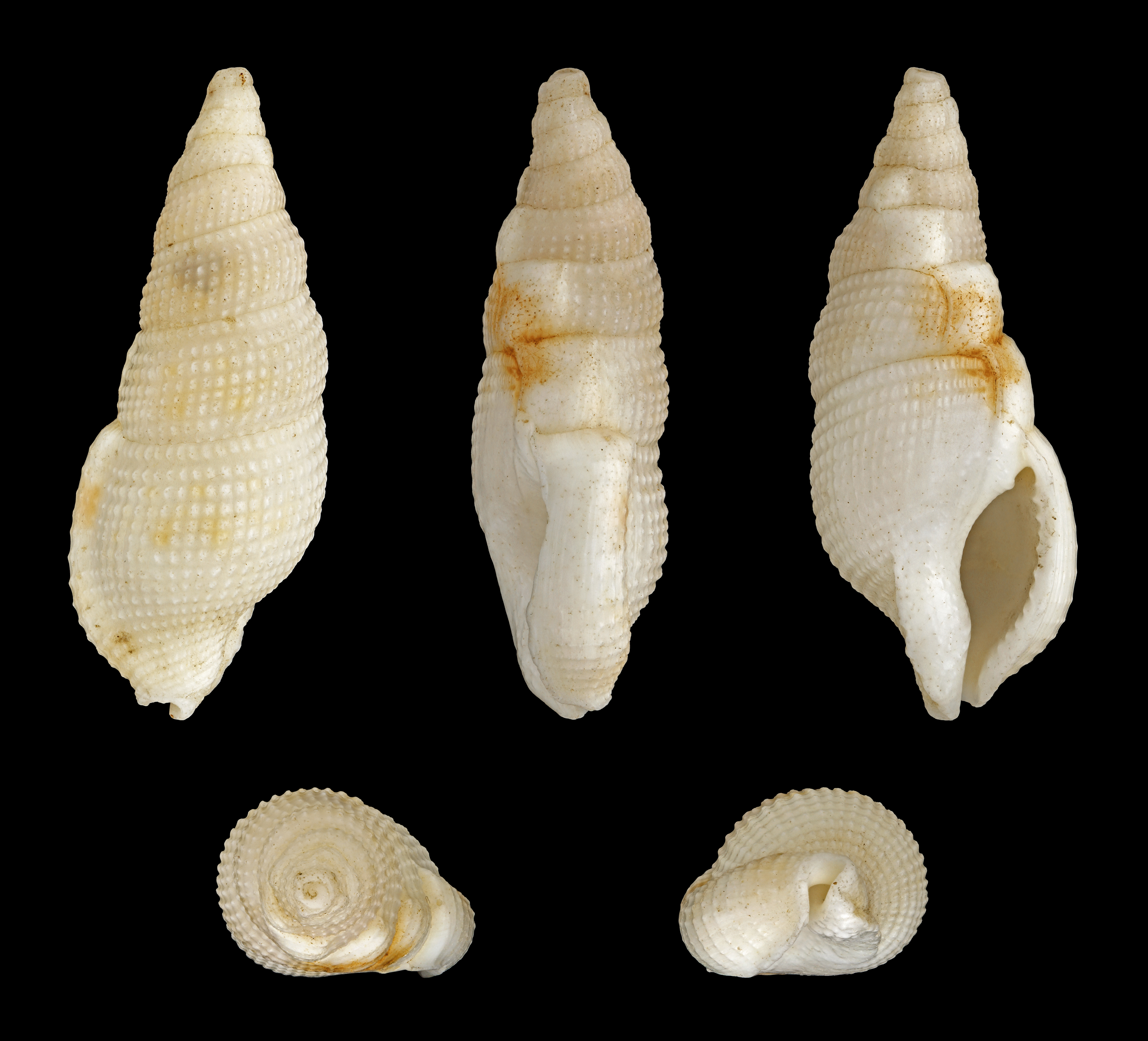
- Five views of a shell of Colubraria tortuosa (Reeve, 1844)

Scientific classification
- Kingdom: Animalia
- Phylum: Mollusca
- Class: Gastropoda
- Subclass: Caenogastropoda
- Order: Neogastropoda
- Superfamily: Buccinoidea
- Family: Colubrariidae
- Genus: Colubraria; Schumacher, 1817

Type species
- Colubraria granulata Schumacher, 1817

Synonyms
- Epidromus Mörch, 1852 (not available from Agassiz, 1846); Obex Iredale, 1925; Roquesia Petuch, 2013; Triton (Epidromus) Mörch, 1852

= Colubraria =

Genus of gastropods

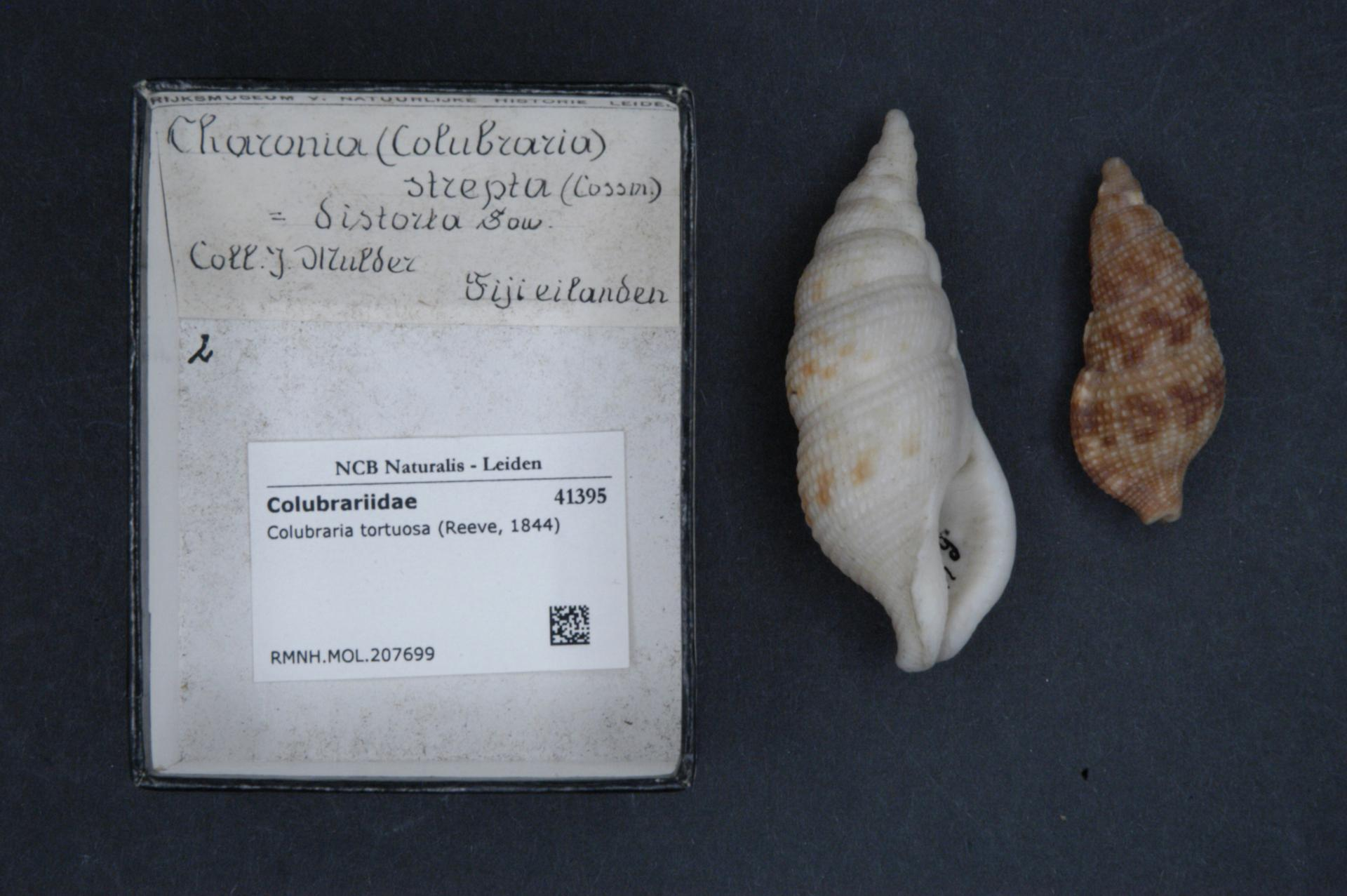
Colubraria tortuosa (Reeve, 1844)

Colubraria is a genus of sea snails, marine gastropod mollusks in the family Colubrariidae. Members of this genus lack a radula and feed by sucking blood from fish.

== Species ==
Species within the genus Colubraria include:

- Colubraria acroincisa S.-I Huang & M.-H. Lin, 2019
- Colubraria albometulaformis Dekkers, 2007
- Colubraria brinkae Parth, 1992
- Colubraria buitendijki Bayer, 1933
- Colubraria canariensis Nordsieck & Talavera, 1979
- Colubraria ceylonensis Sowerby I, 1833
- Colubraria clathrata (Sowerby I, 1833)
- Colubraria cumingi (Dohrn, 1861)
- Colubraria eugenei Bozzetti & Lussi, 1991
- Colubraria gilberti D. Monsecour & Dekker, 2014
- Colubraria harryleei D. Monsecour & K. Monsecour, 2011
- Colubraria jordani Strong, 1938
- Colubraria kathiewayana Fittkau & Parth, 1993
- Colubraria latericium Bozzetti, 2008
- Colubraria lucasensis Strong & Hertlein, 1937
- Colubraria maculosa Gmelin, 1790
- Colubraria margarethae D. Monsecour & K. Monsecour, 2011
- Colubraria mulveyana (Iredale, 1925)
- Colubraria muricata (Lightfoot, 1786)
- Colubraria myuna Garrard, 1961
- † Colubraria neozelanica Maxwell, 1966
- Colubraria nitidula (Sowerby I, 1833)
- Colubraria obscura (Reeve, 1844)
- Colubraria ochsneri Hertlein & Allison, 1968
- Colubraria procera (Sowerby I, 1832)
- Colubraria ralliserra S.-I Huang & M.-H. Lin, 2019
- Colubraria reticosa A. Adams, 1870
- Colubraria rolli Parth, 1992
- Colubraria sowerbii (Reeve, 1844)
- Colubraria springsteeni Parth, 1991
- Colubraria suduirauti Parth, 1999
- † Colubraria sutherlandi Beu, 1973
- Colubraria tchangsii Ma X. & Zhang S., 2000
- Colubraria tenera Gray, 1839
- Colubraria testacea (Morch, 1854)
- Colubraria tortuosa (Reeve, 1844)
- Colubraria tumida Ma X. & Zhang S., 2000

Species brought into synonymy

- Colubraria antiquata: synonym of Tritonoharpa antiquata (Hinds in Reeve, 1844)
- Colubraria antillana Sarasúa, 1978: synonym of Cumia antillana (Sarasúa, 1978)
- Colubraria brazieri (Angas, 1869) : synonym of Cumia brazieri (Angas, 1869)
- Colubraria castanea Kuroda & Habe, 1952: synonym of Colubraria tenera (Gray, 1839)
- Colubraria digitalis Reeve, 1844: synonym of Maculotriton serriale (Deshayes, 1834)
- Colubraria janlochi Parth, 1991: synonym of Cumia janlochi (Parth, 1991)
- Colubraria pulchrafuscata Dekkers, 2007: synonym of Colubraria springsteeni Parth, 1991
- Colubraria reticulata (de Blainville, 1829): synonym of Cumia reticulata (Blainville, 1829)
- Colubraria sunderlandi Petuch, 1995: synonym of Cumia sunderlandi (Petuch, 1995)
- Colubraria vexillata (Dall, 1908): synonym of Tritonoharpa vexillata Dall, 1908
