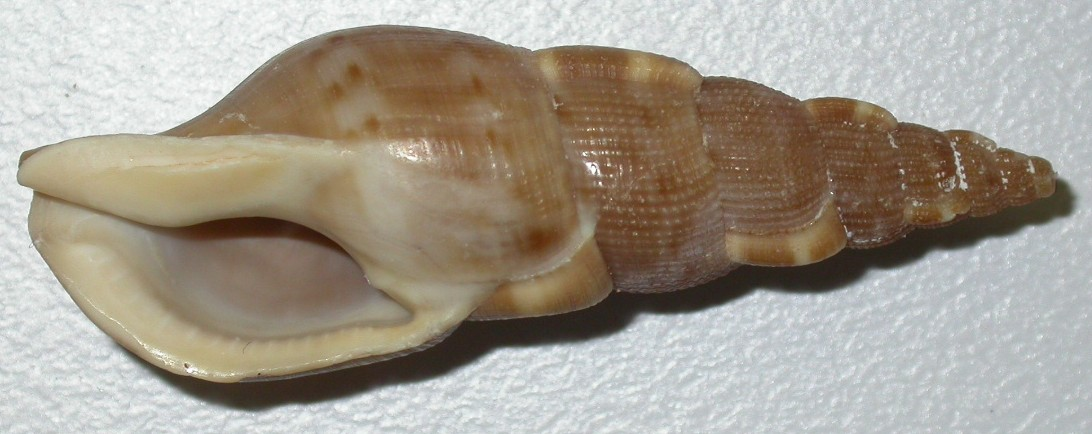
- Shell of Cumia brazieri

Scientific classification
- Kingdom: Animalia
- Phylum: Mollusca
- Class: Gastropoda
- Subclass: Caenogastropoda
- Order: Neogastropoda
- Superfamily: Buccinoidea
- Family: Colubrariidae
- Genus: Cumia; Bivona-Bernardi, 1838

Type species
- Cumia decussata Bivona-Bernardi, 1838

Synonyms
- Fusus Helbling, 1779 (Invalid: Placed by the ICZN on the Official Index by Opinion 1765); Murex (Fusus) Helbling, 1779; Ratifusus Iredale, 1929; Triton (Cumia) Bivona, 1838

= Cumia =

Genus of gastropods

Cumia is a genus of sea snails, marine gastropod mollusks in the family Colubrariidae.

== Description ==
Cumia is similar in many respects to species of Metula. The sculpture consists of numerous fine spiral threads and axial growth striae, but it is more discreet than in Metula. The protoconch, however, consists of only 1½ to 2 small, depressed nuclear whorls. The varices are indefinite, flat, and adpressed, and are similar to those in Metula mitrella and Metula mitraeformis. The radula of Cumia differs appreciably from that of Metula.

== Species ==
Species within the genus Cumia include:

- Cumia adjuncta (Iredale, 1929)
- Cumia alfredensis (Bartsch, 1915)
- Cumia antillana (Sarasúa, 1978)
- Cumia bednalli (Brazier, 1875)
- Cumia brazieri (Angas, 1869)
- † Cumia citharella (Tate, 1888)
- Cumia clavula Watters, 2009
- Cumia intertexta (Helbling, 1779)
- Cumia janlochi (Parth, 1991)
- † Cumia leptoskeles (Tate, 1888)
- Cumia lucasi (Bozzetti, 2007)
- Cumia mestayerae (Iredale, 1915)
- Cumia schoutanica (May, 1910)
- Cumia simonis (Bozzetti, 2004)
- Cumia sunderlandi (Petuch, 1995)
- † Cumia tasmanica (R. M. Johnston, 1880)
- † Cumia tenuicostata (Tenison Woods, 1879)
- Cumia texturata (Tate, 1888)
- Cumia turrita (Tate, 1888)

Species brought into synonymy

- Cumia decussata Bivona-Bernardi, 1838: synonym of Cumia reticulata (Blainville, 1829)
- Cumia reticulata (Blainville, 1829): synonym of Cumia intertexta (Helbling, 1779) (junior homonym, secondary homonym of Colubraria or Cumia reticulata (Blainville, 1829); Fusus mestayerae is a replacement name)
