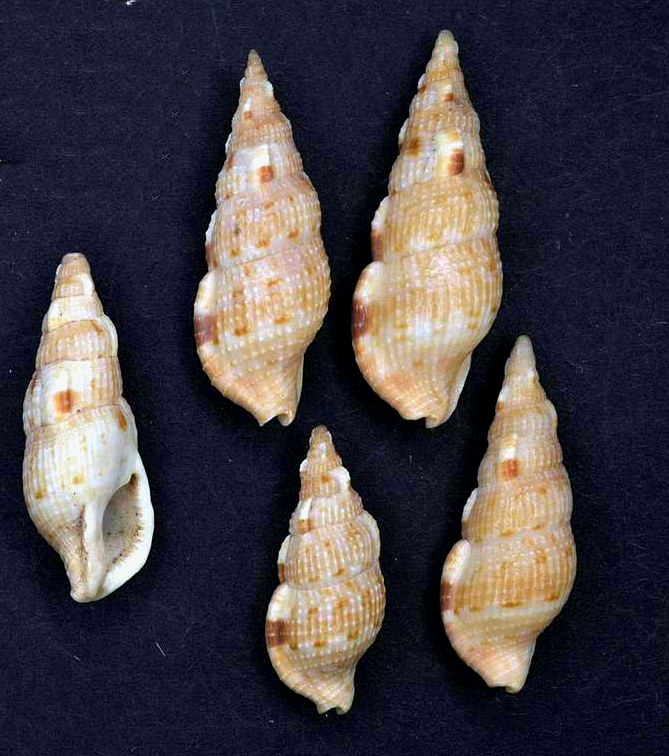
- Several shells of Colubraria obscura (museum specimens at Naturalis Biodiversity Center)

Scientific classification
- Kingdom: Animalia
- Phylum: Mollusca
- Class: Gastropoda
- Subclass: Caenogastropoda
- Order: Neogastropoda
- Family: Colubrariidae
- Genus: Colubraria
- Species: C. obscura

Binomial name
- Colubraria obscura (Reeve, 1844)

Synonyms
- Triton obscurus Reeve, 1844

= Colubraria obscura =

Species of gastropod

Colubraria obscura is a species of sea snail, a marine gastropod mollusk in the family Colubrariidae.

== Description ==
The size of the shell varies between 25 mm and 60 mm.

== Distribution ==
This marine species has a wide distribution: Florida, USA, to Brazil; off Canary Islands, Cape Verdes, Angola, Mozambique; in the Mediterranean Sea; in the Red Sea; in the Western Indian Ocean.
