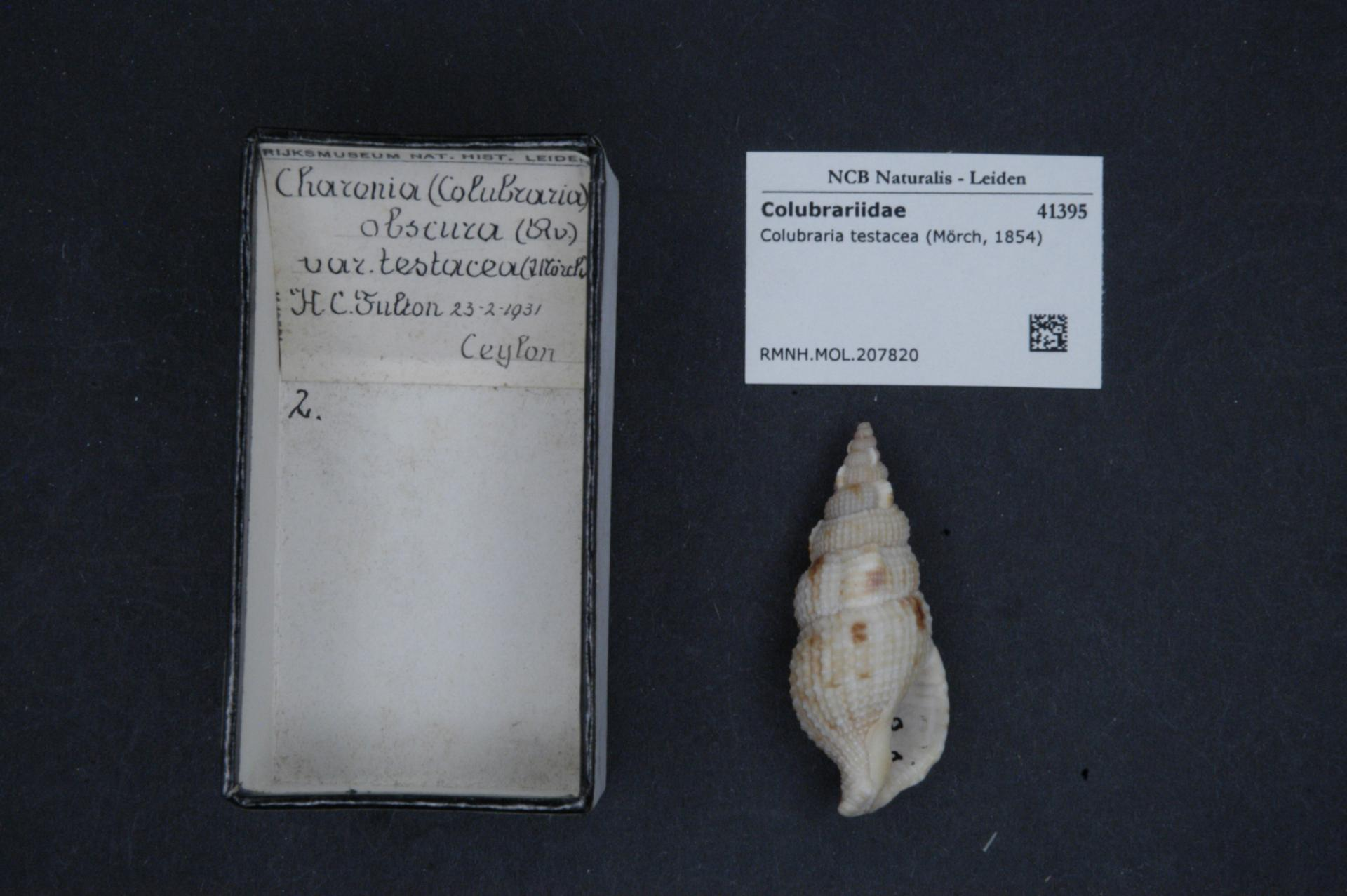

Scientific classification
- Kingdom: Animalia
- Phylum: Mollusca
- Class: Gastropoda
- Subclass: Caenogastropoda
- Order: Neogastropoda
- Family: Colubrariidae
- Genus: Colubraria
- Species: C. testacea

Binomial name
- Colubraria testacea Morch

= Colubraria testacea =

Species of gastropod

Colubraria testacea is a species of sea snail, a marine gastropod mollusk in the family Colubrariidae.
