= Colubraria canariensis =

Scientific classification
- Kingdom: Animalia
- Phylum: Mollusca
- Class: Gastropoda
- Subclass: Caenogastropoda
- Order: Neogastropoda
- Family: Colubrariidae
- Genus: Colubraria
- Species: C. canariensis

Binomial name
- Colubraria canariensis Nordsieck & Talavera, 1979

Species of gastropod

Colubraria canariensis is a species of sea snail, a marine gastropod mollusk in the family Colubrariidae.
