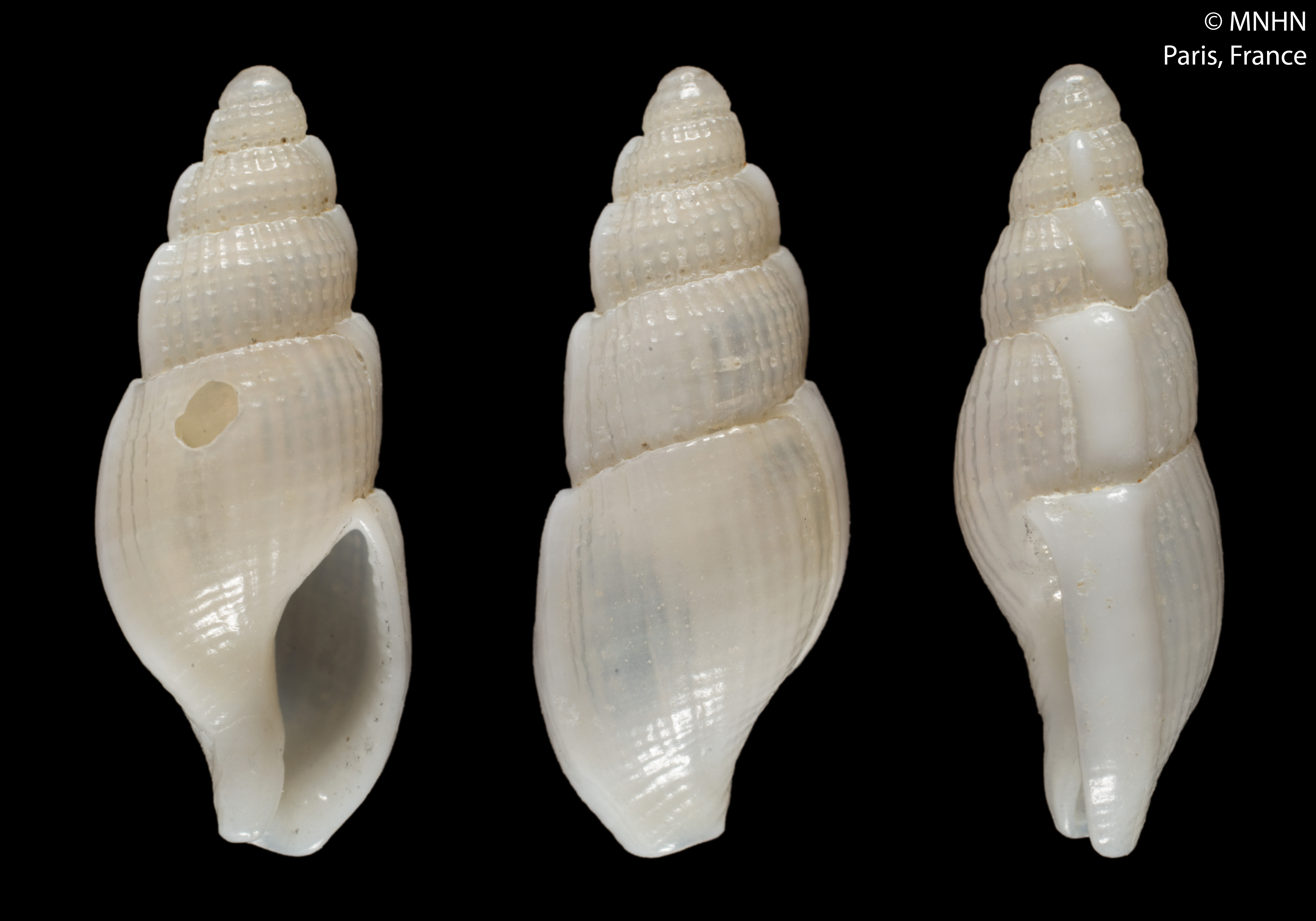
- Shell of Cumia lucasi (holotype at MNHN, Paris)

Scientific classification
- Kingdom: Animalia
- Phylum: Mollusca
- Class: Gastropoda
- Subclass: Caenogastropoda
- Order: Neogastropoda
- Family: Colubrariidae
- Genus: Cumia
- Species: C. lucasi

Binomial name
- Cumia lucasi (Bozzetti, 2007)

Synonyms
- Fusus lucasi Bozzetti, 2007

= Cumia lucasi =

Species of gastropod

Cumia lucasi is a species of sea snail, a marine gastropod mollusk in the family Colubrariidae.

== Description ==
The shell diameter is 11 mm.

== Distribution ==
This species occurs in the Indian Ocean off Madagascar.
