= Colubraria tumida =

Scientific classification
- Kingdom: Animalia
- Phylum: Mollusca
- Class: Gastropoda
- Subclass: Caenogastropoda
- Order: Neogastropoda
- Family: Colubrariidae
- Genus: Colubraria
- Species: C. tumida

Binomial name
- Colubraria tumida Ma X. & Zhang S., 2000

Species of gastropod

Colubraria tumida is a species of sea snail, a marine gastropod mollusk in the family Colubrariidae.
