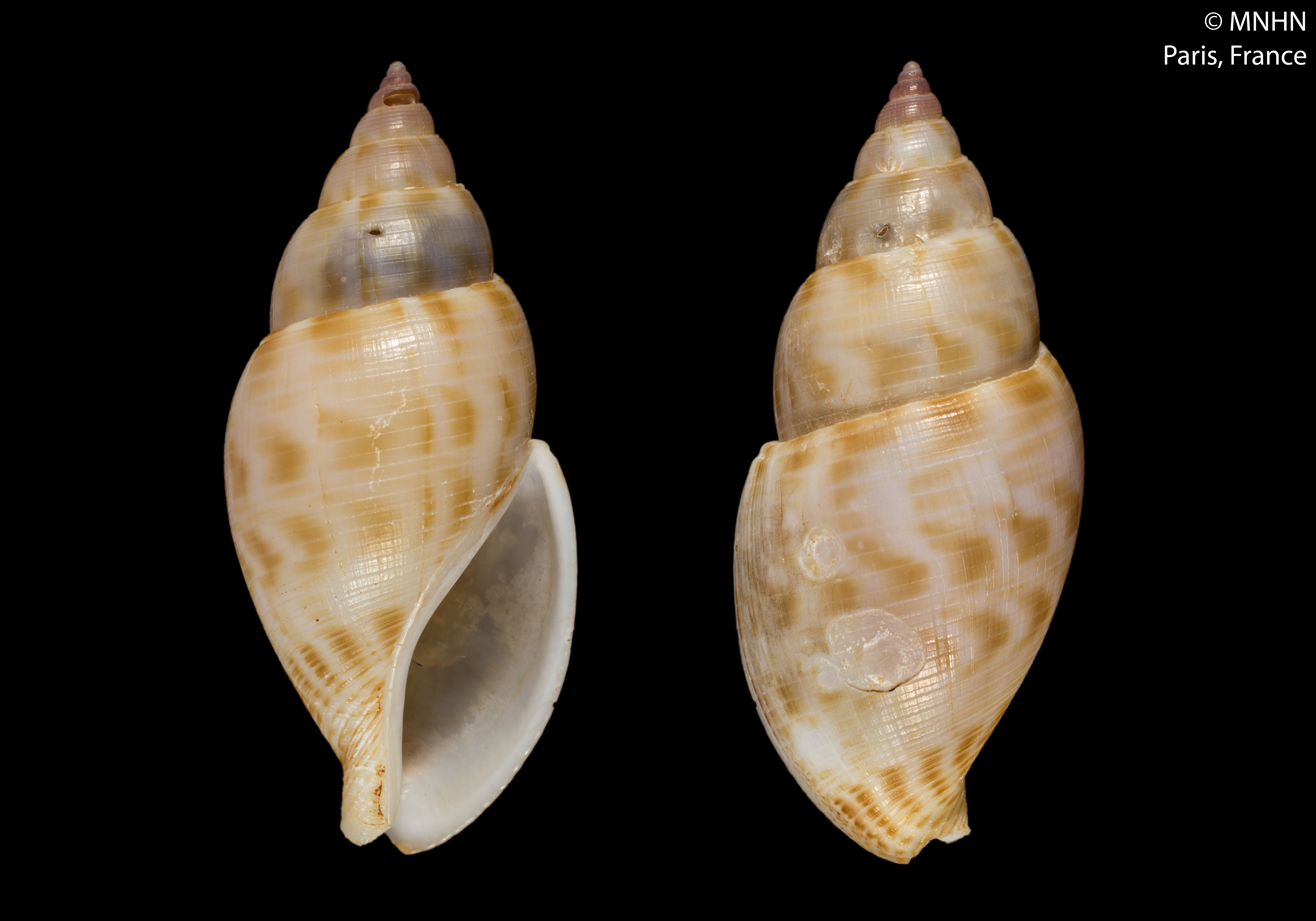
- Shell of Kanamarua francroberti (holotype at MNHN, Paris)

Scientific classification
- Kingdom: Animalia
- Phylum: Mollusca
- Class: Gastropoda
- Subclass: Caenogastropoda
- Order: Neogastropoda
- Family: Colubrariidae
- Genus: Kanamarua
- Species: K. francroberti

Binomial name
- Kanamarua francroberti Fraussen & Lamy, 2008

= Kanamarua francroberti =

Species of gastropod

Kanamarua francroberti is a species of sea snail, a marine gastropod mollusk in the family Colubrariidae.

== Description ==
The length of the shell attains 58 mm.

== Distribution ==
This marine species occurs off Guadeloupe.
