= Iredalula striata =

Scientific classification
- Kingdom: Animalia
- Phylum: Mollusca
- Class: Gastropoda
- Subclass: Caenogastropoda
- Order: Neogastropoda
- Family: Colubrariidae
- Genus: Iredalula
- Species: †I. striata

Binomial name
- †Iredalula striata (F. W. Hutton, 1873) †

Synonyms
- † Bela striata F. W. Hutton, 1873 (superseded combination); Siphonalia cingulata F. W. Hutton, 1885 junior subjective synonym

Species of gastropod

Iredalula striata is an extinct species of sea snail, a marine gastropod mollusk in the family Colubrariidae.

== Description ==
This characteristic New Zealand Pliocene shell presents a most striking similarity to † Metula mitraeformis (Brocchi, 1814) (Cossmann, Essais de Pal. Comp., liv. iv, p. 123, 1901). However, this resemblance is entirely superficial, as a brief glance at their respective embryos will readily reveal M. mitraeformis possesses, in Cossmann's own words, a "protoconque lisse, paucispirée, formant un gros bouton à nucléus subdévié". In stark contrast, I. striata features a curiously-shouldered and disproportionately-whorled embryo. The tip of its apex is globular and a trifle inrolled, while the remainder of the structure develops a high, blunt keel, a wide and flat shoulder, and a straight profile below. Furthermore, obscure cord-like lirations — two of which are more prominent on the keel — are very faintly reticulated by subtle growth-lines, though the entire surface remains smoothish and highly polished. The siphonal canal and the pattern of the whorling are also somewhat different between the two species. In its fossilized state, the shell itself is pure white and extremely elegant. Iredalula alticincta (Murdoch & Suter, 1906) — which stands as another of our most elegant shells —alongside several undescribed species, possess this same peculiar apex and style of shell. Consequently, they are all referable to this genus, which may be comfortably placed within the family Colubrariidae.

== Distribution ==
Fossils of this marine species have been found on North Island, New Zealand.
