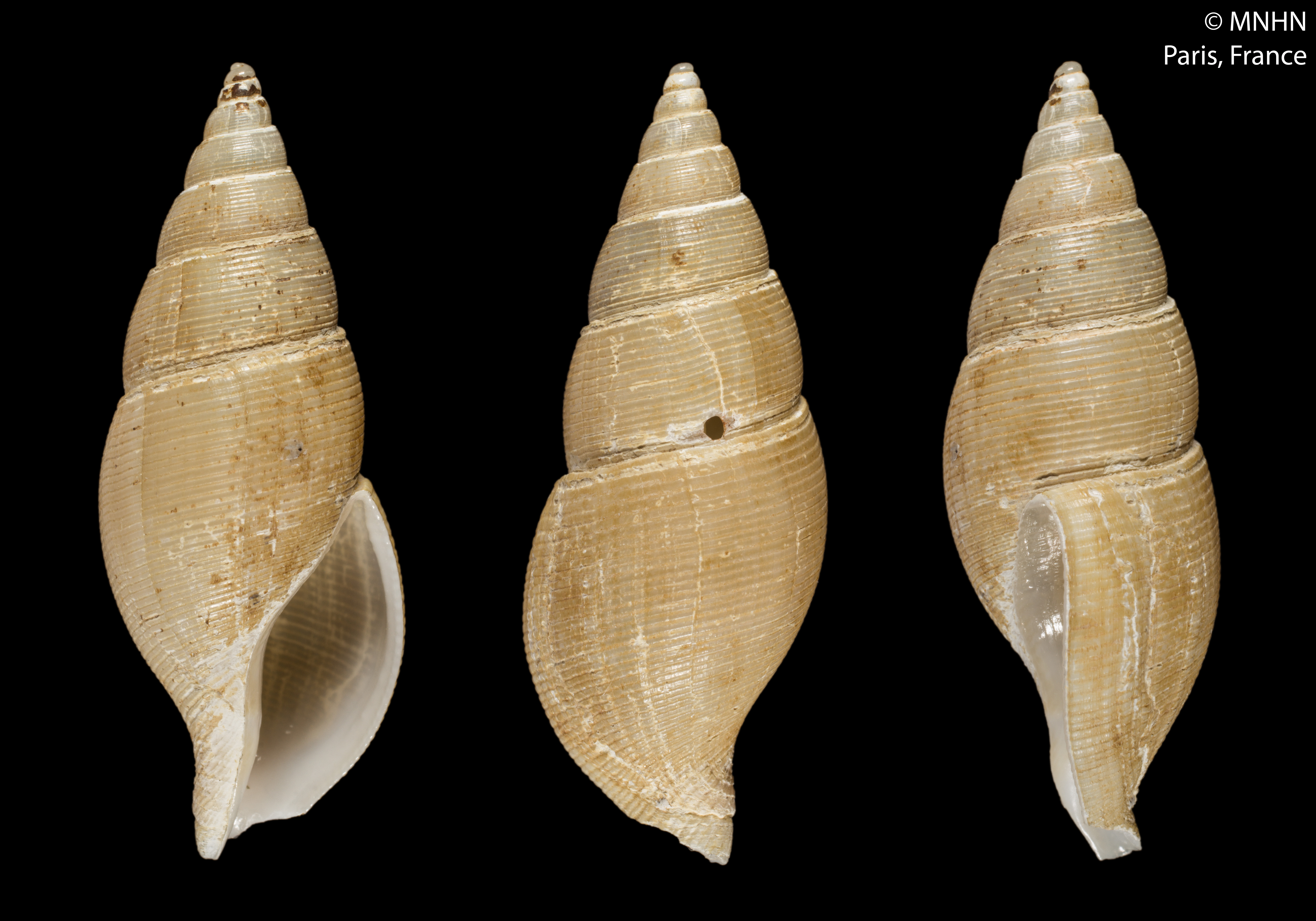
- Shell of Kanamarua narcissisma (holotype at MNHN, Paris)

Scientific classification
- Kingdom: Animalia
- Phylum: Mollusca
- Class: Gastropoda
- Subclass: Caenogastropoda
- Order: Neogastropoda
- Family: Colubrariidae
- Genus: Kanamarua
- Species: K. narcissisma

Binomial name
- Kanamarua narcissisma Fraussen & Lamy, 2008

= Kanamarua narcissisma =

Species of gastropod

Kanamarua narcissisma is a species of sea snail, a marine gastropod mollusk in the family Colubrariidae.

== Description ==
The length of the shell attains 41 mm. It is characterized by a slender shell with numerous fine spiral cords and rather narrow but deep interspaces. It is solid, semi transparent and white.

== Distribution ==
This marine species occurs off Indonesia.
