= Metula gigliottii =

Scientific classification
- Kingdom: Animalia
- Phylum: Mollusca
- Class: Gastropoda
- Subclass: Caenogastropoda
- Order: Neogastropoda
- Family: Colubrariidae
- Genus: Metula
- Species: M. gigliottii

Binomial name
- Metula gigliottii Coltro, 2005

Species of gastropod

Metula gigliottii is a species of sea snail, a marine gastropod mollusk in the family Colubrariidae, the true whelks.
