= Cumia alfredensis =

Scientific classification
- Kingdom: Animalia
- Phylum: Mollusca
- Class: Gastropoda
- Subclass: Caenogastropoda
- Order: Neogastropoda
- Family: Colubrariidae
- Genus: Cumia
- Species: C. alfredensis

Binomial name
- Cumia alfredensis (Bartsch, 1915)

Synonyms
- Colubraria alfredensis Bartsch, 1915; Fusus alfredensis (Bartsch, 1915); Ratifusus alfredensis (Bartsch, 1915)

Species of gastropod

Cumia alfredensis, common name : the narrow dwarf triton, is a species of sea snail, a marine gastropod mollusk in the family Colubrariidae.

== Description ==
The shell size varies between 20 mm and 50 mm.

== Distribution ==
It is distributed along KwaZuluNatal, South Africa.
