= Metula aegrota =

Scientific classification
- Kingdom: Animalia
- Phylum: Mollusca
- Class: Gastropoda
- Subclass: Caenogastropoda
- Order: Neogastropoda
- Family: Colubrariidae
- Genus: Metula
- Species: M. aegrota

Binomial name
- Metula aegrota (Reeve, 1845)

Synonyms
- Antimitra aegrota (Reeve, 1845); Pleurotoma aegrota Reeve, 1845 (basionym)

Species of gastropod

Metula aegrota is a species of sea snail, a marine gastropod mollusk in the family Colubrariidae.

== Distribution ==
This species occurs along Singapore.
