= Cumia adjuncta =

Scientific classification
- Kingdom: Animalia
- Phylum: Mollusca
- Class: Gastropoda
- Subclass: Caenogastropoda
- Order: Neogastropoda
- Family: Colubrariidae
- Genus: Cumia
- Species: C. adjuncta

Binomial name
- Cumia adjuncta (Iredale, 1929)

Synonyms
- Fusus adjunctus (Iredale, 1929); Ratifusus adjunctus Iredale, 1929

Species of gastropod

Cumia adjuncta is a species of sea snail, a marine gastropod mollusk in the family Colubrariidae, the spindle snails, the tulip snails and their allies.

== Distribution ==
This species is distributed in the seas along New Zealand.
