= Bartschia frumari =

Scientific classification
- Kingdom: Animalia
- Phylum: Mollusca
- Class: Gastropoda
- Subclass: Caenogastropoda
- Order: Neogastropoda
- Family: Colubrariidae
- Genus: Bartschia
- Species: B. frumari

Binomial name
- Bartschia frumari Garcia, 2008

Species of gastropod

Bartschia frumari is a species of sea snail, a marine gastropod mollusc in the family Colubrariidae.
