= Minibraria monroei =

Scientific classification
- Kingdom: Animalia
- Phylum: Mollusca
- Class: Gastropoda
- Subclass: Caenogastropoda
- Order: Neogastropoda
- Family: Colubrariidae
- Genus: Minibraria
- Species: M. monroei

Binomial name
- Minibraria monroei (McGinty, 1962)

Synonyms
- Colubraria monroei McGinty, 1962

Species of gastropod

Minibraria monroei is a species of sea snail, a marine gastropod mollusk in the family Colubrariidae. It is named after collector Henry H. Monroe.

== Distribution ==
This species is found in the Gulf of Mexico.
