= Colubraria springsteeni =

Scientific classification
- Kingdom: Animalia
- Phylum: Mollusca
- Class: Gastropoda
- Subclass: Caenogastropoda
- Order: Neogastropoda
- Family: Colubrariidae
- Genus: Colubraria
- Species: C. springsteeni

Binomial name
- Colubraria springsteeni Parth, 1991

Synonyms
- Colubraria pulchrafuscata Dekkers, 2007

Species of gastropod

Colubraria springsteeni is a species of sea snail, a marine gastropod mollusc in the family Colubrariidae.

== Description ==
Original description: "Tapered shell of medium dimensions for the genus, made up of about 9 convex whorls. One varix per whorl, at irregular distances in the first whorls, at about 300 degrees distance in the last whorls. The colour is light brown, with a wide darker band at the centre of each whorl; some specimens have colour tonalities going from grey to blue. The sculpture is reticulated, very evidentiated and with large granules at the intersection points between spiral cords and axial riblets.

The mouth is elongated over, the internal lip is strongly calloused at the base of the columella, while the calliosity lessens in the parietal zone, where in transparency, the colouring of white and brown bands of the penultimate varix is well visible. The external lip is arched and has a thick robust varix, with alternately 3 dark bands and two white ones. On the inside of the lip there are 12 to 14 long denticles. The siphonal canal is straight and rather long for the genus. The protoconch is paucispiral, almost identical to that of C. castanea Kuroda & Habe, 1952."

== Distribution ==
Locus typicus: "Cebu, Philippines."
