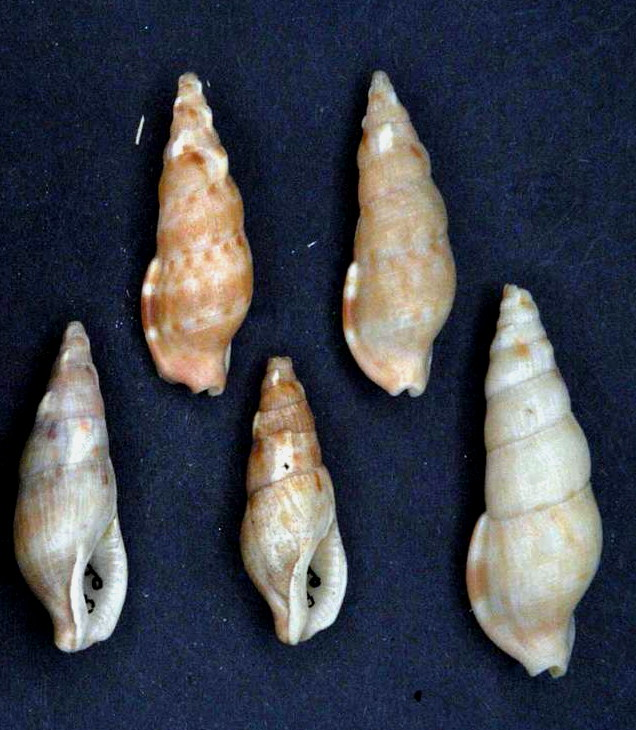
- Several shells of Colubraria nitidula (museum specimens at Naturalis Biodiversity Center)

Scientific classification
- Kingdom: Animalia
- Phylum: Mollusca
- Class: Gastropoda
- Subclass: Caenogastropoda
- Order: Neogastropoda
- Family: Colubrariidae
- Genus: Colubraria
- Species: C. nitidula

Binomial name
- Colubraria nitidula (Sowerby I, 1833)

Synonyms
- Triton nitidulus G. B. Sowerby I, 1833 (original combination)

= Colubraria nitidula =

Species of gastropod

Colubraria nitidula, common name the shiny dwarf triton, is a species of sea snail, a marine gastropod mollusk in the family Colubrariidae.

== Description ==
The length of shell varies between 20 mm and 66 mm.

Their functional group is benthos.

Their feeding type is predatory.

== Distribution ==
This marine species occurs off Northern Transkei, South Africa; in the Indo-West Pacific (off Mauritius, Aldabra, Mascarene Basin).
