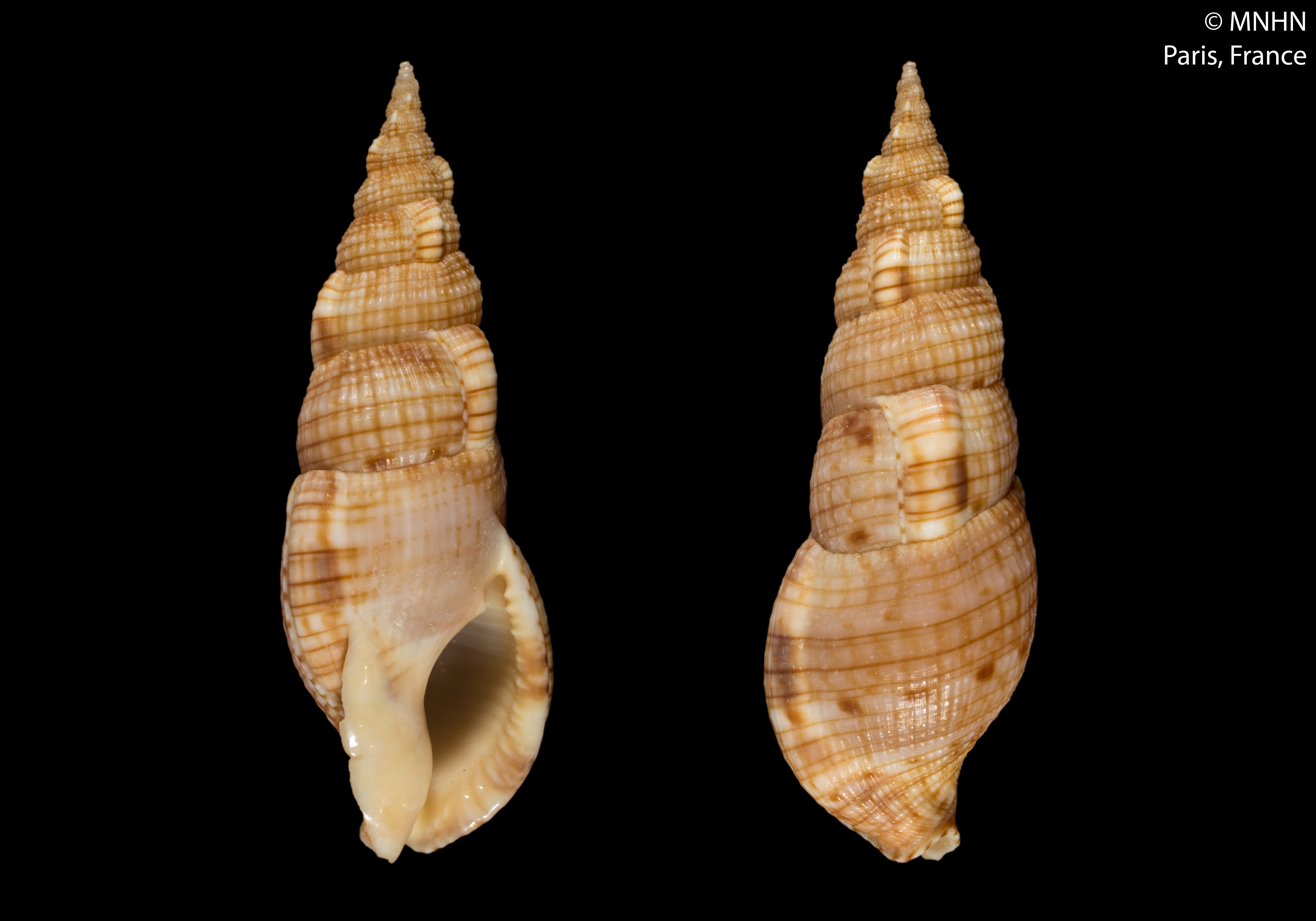
- Shell of Colubraria latericium (holotype at MNHN, Paris)

Scientific classification
- Kingdom: Animalia
- Phylum: Mollusca
- Class: Gastropoda
- Subclass: Caenogastropoda
- Order: Neogastropoda
- Family: Colubrariidae
- Genus: Colubraria
- Species: C. latericium

Binomial name
- Colubraria latericium Bozzetti, 2008

= Colubraria latericium =

Species of gastropod

Colubraria latericium is a species of sea snail, a marine gastropod mollusk in the family Colubrariidae.

== Description ==
The length of the shell attains 60.6 mm.

== Distribution ==
This marine species occurs off Madagascar.
