= Iredalula groschi =

Scientific classification
- Kingdom: Animalia
- Phylum: Mollusca
- Class: Gastropoda
- Subclass: Caenogastropoda
- Order: Neogastropoda
- Family: Colubrariidae
- Genus: Iredalula
- Species: I. groschi

Binomial name
- Iredalula groschi Fraussen & Monsecour, 2007

Species of gastropod

Iredalula groschi is a species of sea snail, a marine gastropod mollusk in the family Colubrariidae.
