= Cumia bednalli =

Scientific classification
- Kingdom: Animalia
- Phylum: Mollusca
- Class: Gastropoda
- Subclass: Caenogastropoda
- Order: Neogastropoda
- Family: Colubrariidae
- Genus: Cumia
- Species: C. bednalli

Binomial name
- Cumia bednalli (Brazier, 1875)

Synonyms
- Epidromus bednalli Brazier, 1875; Fusus bednalli; (Brazier, 1875)

Species of gastropod

Cumia bednalli is a species of sea snail, a marine gastropod mollusk in the family Colubrariidae.

== Description ==
The shell size is 20 mm

== Distribution ==
This species is distributed around the southern Australian coast from South Queensland to Western Australia.
