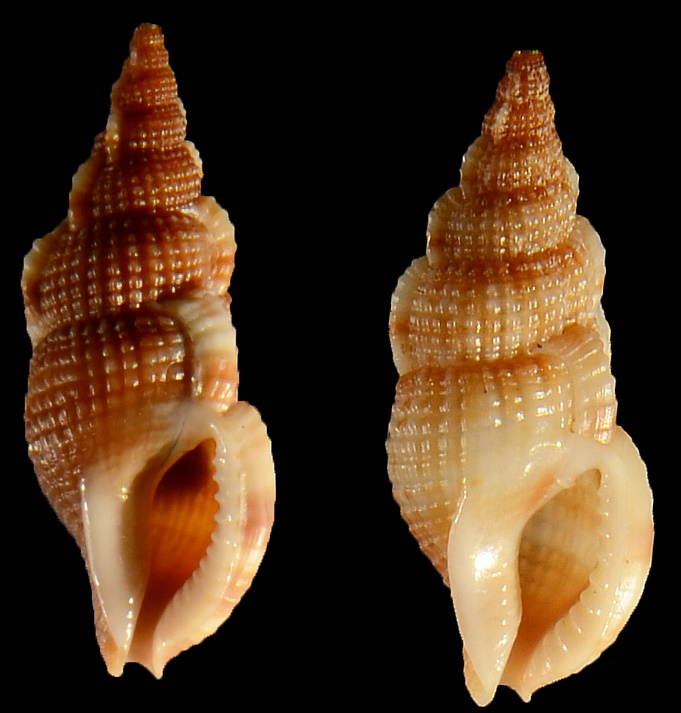

Scientific classification
- Kingdom: Animalia
- Phylum: Mollusca
- Class: Gastropoda
- Subclass: Caenogastropoda
- Order: Neogastropoda
- Family: Colubrariidae
- Genus: Cumia
- Species: C. intertexta

Binomial name
- Cumia intertexta (Helbling, 1779)

Synonyms
- List: Murex (Fusus) intertextus Helbling, 1779; Colubraria intertexta Helbling, 1779; Colubraria reticulata Blainville, 1829; Colubraria reticulata var. profundorum Ardovini, 2014; Colubraria reticulata var. spongiarum Kobelt, 1901; Cumia decussata Bivona & Bernardi, 1838; Cumia reticulata var. inflata Coen, 1922; Epidromus reticulatus Blainville, 1829; Epidromus reticulatus var. albina Monterosato, 1880; Epidromus reticulatus var. atra Monterosato, 1880; Epidromus reticulatus var. fasciata Monterosato, 1880; Epidromus reticulatus var. fulva Monterosato, 1880; Epidromus reticulatus var. minor Monterosato, 1880; Epidromus reticulatus var. nivea Monterosato, 1880; Epidromus reticulatus var. spongiarum Kobelt, 1901; Murex calfius Brusina, 1870; Triton mediterraneum G. B. Sowerby II, 1833; Triton reticulatum Blainville, 1829; Triton (Cumia) reticulatus var. biplex Coen, 1922; Triton turriculatum Deshayes, 1835; Tritonium bonanni Delle Chiaje, 1830

= Cumia intertexta =

Species of gastropod

Cumia intertexta, commonly known as the Mediterranean vampire snail, is a species of marine gastropod in the family Colubrariidae. It is characterized by its hematophagous feeding habits, as it feeds by sucking blood from fish.

In 2026, the species was the winner of the International Mollusc of the Year, an initiative that annually selects five candidate species for a public vote; the top-voted species is awarded full genome sequencing by the Senckenberg Society for Nature Research. Other candidates in 2026 were Ephippodonta lunata, Lithoredo abatanica, Triplofusus giganteus, and Vaginula seychellensis. In 2025, the award went to the genus Muusoctopus, a deep-sea octopus.

== Distribution and habitat ==
Cumia intertexta reaches a maximum length of about 3 centimetres (1.2 in) and is found in the southern part of the Mediterranean basin (including Sardinia, Sicily, Apulia, Calabria, and the North African coasts). Its distribution largely overlaps with that of Sparisoma cretense (Mediterranean parrotfish), although it may also feed on other fish species such as gobies, scorpionfish, stargazers, and blennies.

== Biology ==
This species is the only representative of the family Colubrariidae in the Mediterranean Sea, a family that includes about one hundred species, most of which are hematophagous. These gastropods typically inhabit shallow waters, hiding during the day under stones or in crevices in rocks and coral reefs, and becoming active at night.

Their preferred prey appears to be parrotfish, which tend to return to the same resting sites each night. Colubrariids can locate nearby fish in the dark and pierce their skin using small teeth located at the tip of a long, extensible proboscis, which can reach up to ten times the length of the shell. They then inject a mixture of bioactive substances produced in their salivary glands, enabling them to anesthetize the fish and keep its blood in a fluid state while feeding. After feeding, they retract the proboscis and return to hiding, leaving the fish stunned but alive.

The venom of Cumia intertexta contains numerous bioactive proteins, including anticoagulants, anesthetics, tissue-dissolving proteins, and an enzyme capable of increasing the fish's blood pressure, thereby accelerating feeding. Some of these proteins may have potential applications in the treatment of human diseases.

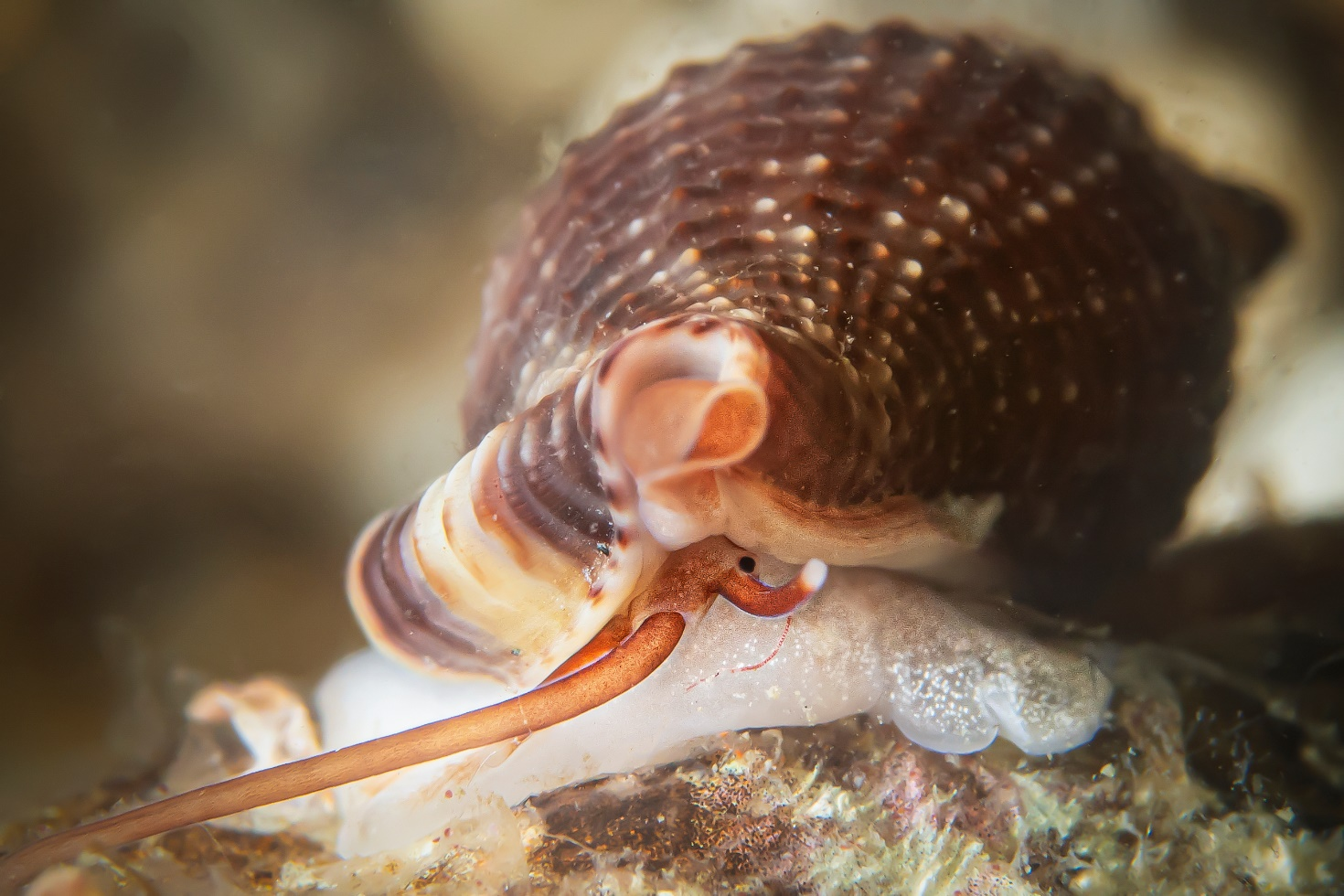
Cumia intertexta with its proboscis extended

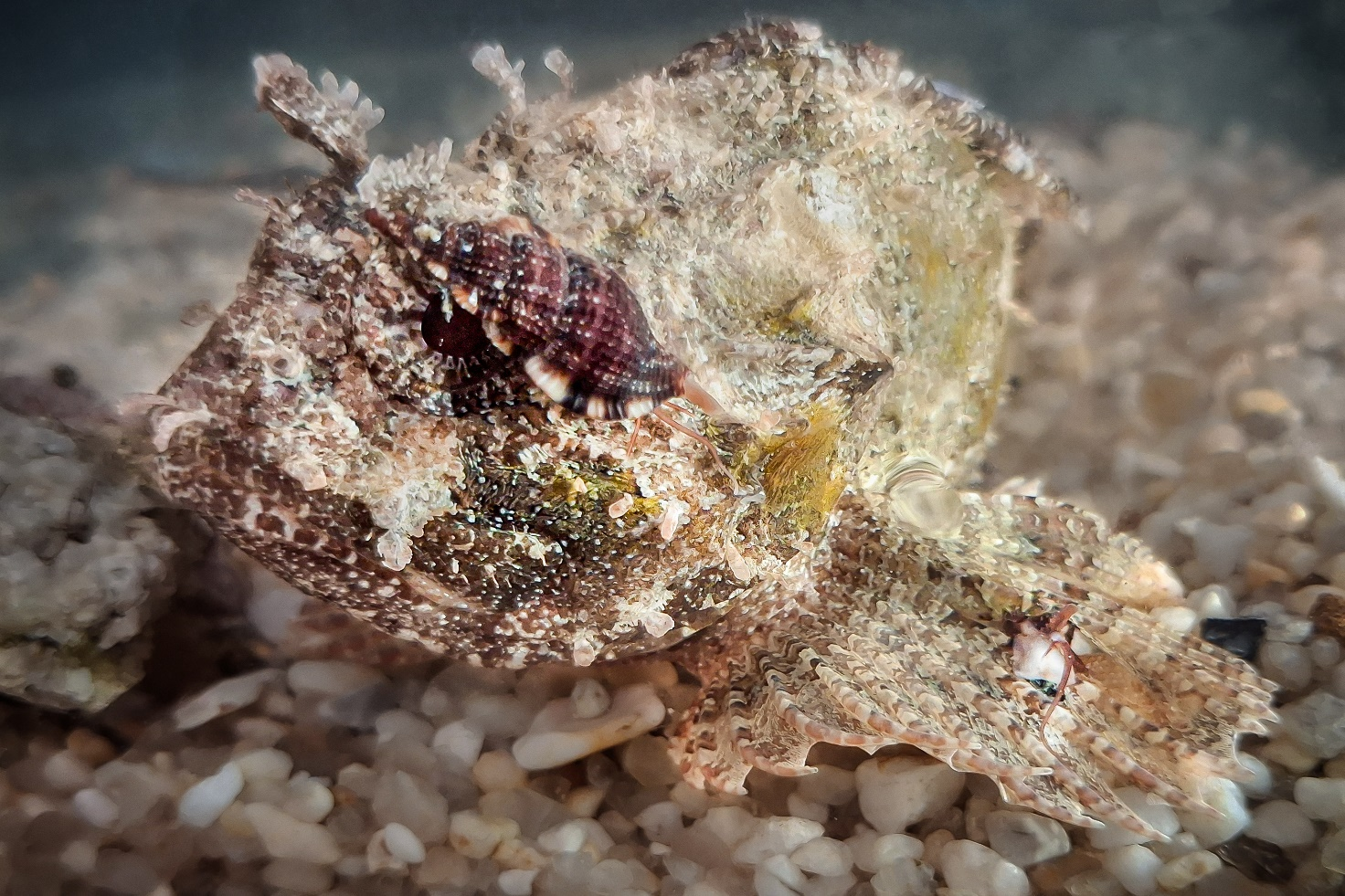
Cumia intertexta feeding on a scorpionfish

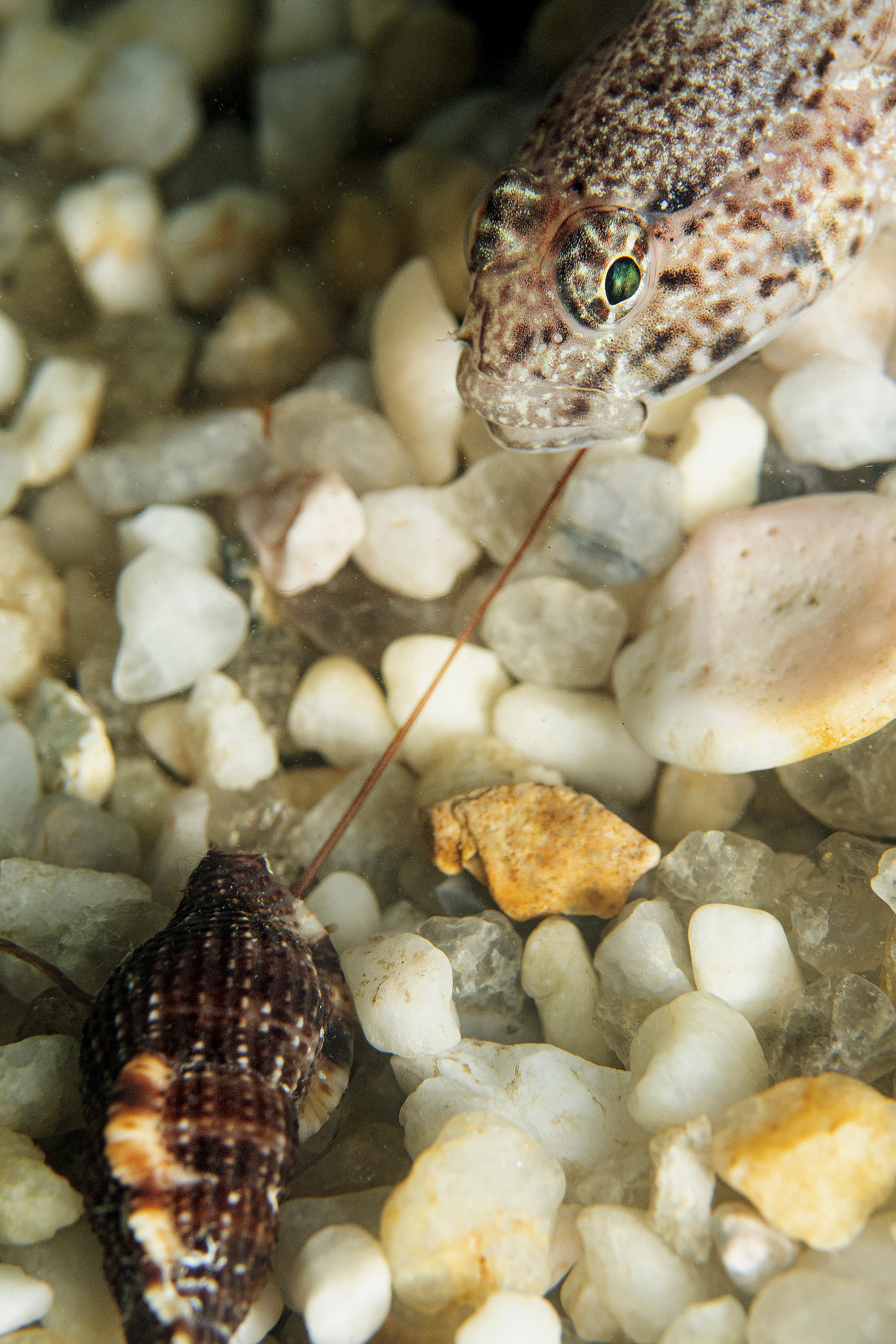
Cumia intertexta feeding on a goby
