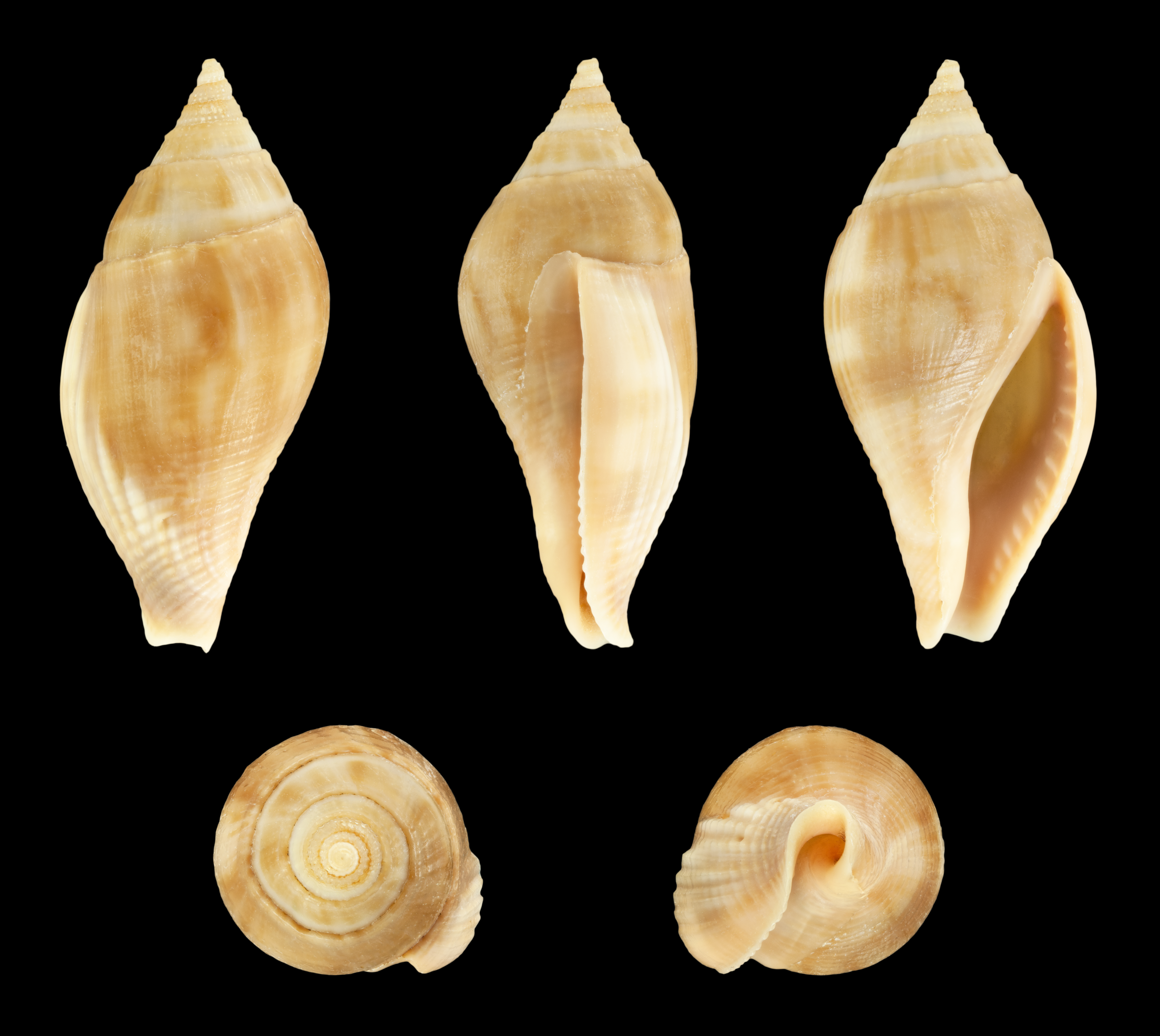

Scientific classification
- Kingdom: Animalia
- Phylum: Mollusca
- Class: Gastropoda
- Subclass: Caenogastropoda
- Order: Neogastropoda
- Family: Colubrariidae
- Genus: Metula
- Species: M. cumingi

Binomial name
- Metula cumingi A. Adams, 1853

= Metula cumingi =

Species of gastropod

Metula cumingi is a species of sea snail, a marine gastropod mollusk in the family Colubrariidae, the true whelks.
