= Marjorie Mestayer =

New Zealand museum curator and conchologist

- Born: 1880; England
- Died: 7 September 1955
- Occupations: Museum curator and conchologist

Marjorie Katherine Mestayer (1880 – 7 September 1955) was a New Zealand curator and conchologist. She is best known for the molluscan, foraminiferal and ostracod species named after her. Beginning as an amateur shell enthusiast, she went on to work as a conchology curator for the Dominion Museum in Wellington. She also received grants for her conchology research. She donated scientific and personal collections to the Museum of New Zealand Te Papa Tongarewa.

== History ==
In 1880, Mestayer was born in England. Her family migrated to Australia when she was 2, and to Wellington when she was 12. Her father, Richard Mestayer, was "an amateur naturalist with interests in things microscopic, like foraminifera. Undoubtedly his enthusiasm for the natural world rubbed off on Marjorie".

From her teens, Mestayer began collecting and analysing shells. At first her displays and publications were in support of other conchologists, including Tom Iredale. Later, independently, she collected and analysed sands and dredgings from New Zealand shorelines including Titahi Bay and deep-water dredgings provided by Captain John Peter Bollins.

Mestayer was the conchologist at the Dominion Museum between 1907 and 1932. She also donated specimens to the Auckland Museum, where her frequent correspondent, Baden Powell, was the chief conchologist. Her works included 18 publications between 1907 and 1930. She focused on gastropods and chitons. Much of her work turned out to be synonyms or replication, due to issues in obtaining current literature. Much of her work is still considered to be valid.

As a Wellington resident, Mestayer was active with the St. John Ambulance Association and the Anglican church. She was also the subject of a popular culture profile in the newspaper NZ Truth:

How many women, once having survived the experience of being chased out of a pool by a large and indignant octopus, would go back and ask for more? Few and far between such hardy ladies may be, but Miss Marjorie Mestayer, who has charge of the Conchological Department at the Dominion Museum, holds that such little incidents are part of the day’s work and that, anyhow, the octopus probably felt worse about it than she did…She was given her present post at the Museum several years back, mainly because Wellington could at that time produce no man who knew much more about shells than that they were curious things found on beaches.

— "Sea Shore Shells", NZ Truth, December 6, 1928

Mestayer died in 1955. In 2017, Mestayer was selected as one of the Royal Society Te Apārangi's "150 women in 150 words", a project celebrating the contributions of women to expanding knowledge in New Zealand.

== Species ==
Species named in honour of Marjorie Mestayer are:

- Lepidoplerus mestayerae
- Parachiton mestayerae
- Lima mestayerae (Pleistocene)
- Cumia mestayerae
- Cyclochlamys mestayerae
- Eulimella mestayerae
- Perrierina mestayerae

== Selected works ==
- Mestayer, Marjorie K., "New Zealand Mollusca No. 3", Transactions and Proceedings of the Royal Society of New Zealand 56 (1926): 583–587.
- Mestayer, Marjorie K., "A Note on Sigapatella terraenovae Peile. A new Montfortula." Transactions and Proceedings of the Royal Society of New Zealand. 59 (1928): 622–624.
- Mestayer, Marjorie K., "Notes on New Zealand Mollusca No. 4." Transactions and Proceedings of the Royal Society of New Zealand. 60 (1930): 247–250
- Mestayer, Marjorie K., "Notes on New Zealand Mollusca No. 5," Transactions and Proceedings of the Royal Society of New Zealand. 61 (1930): 144–146
