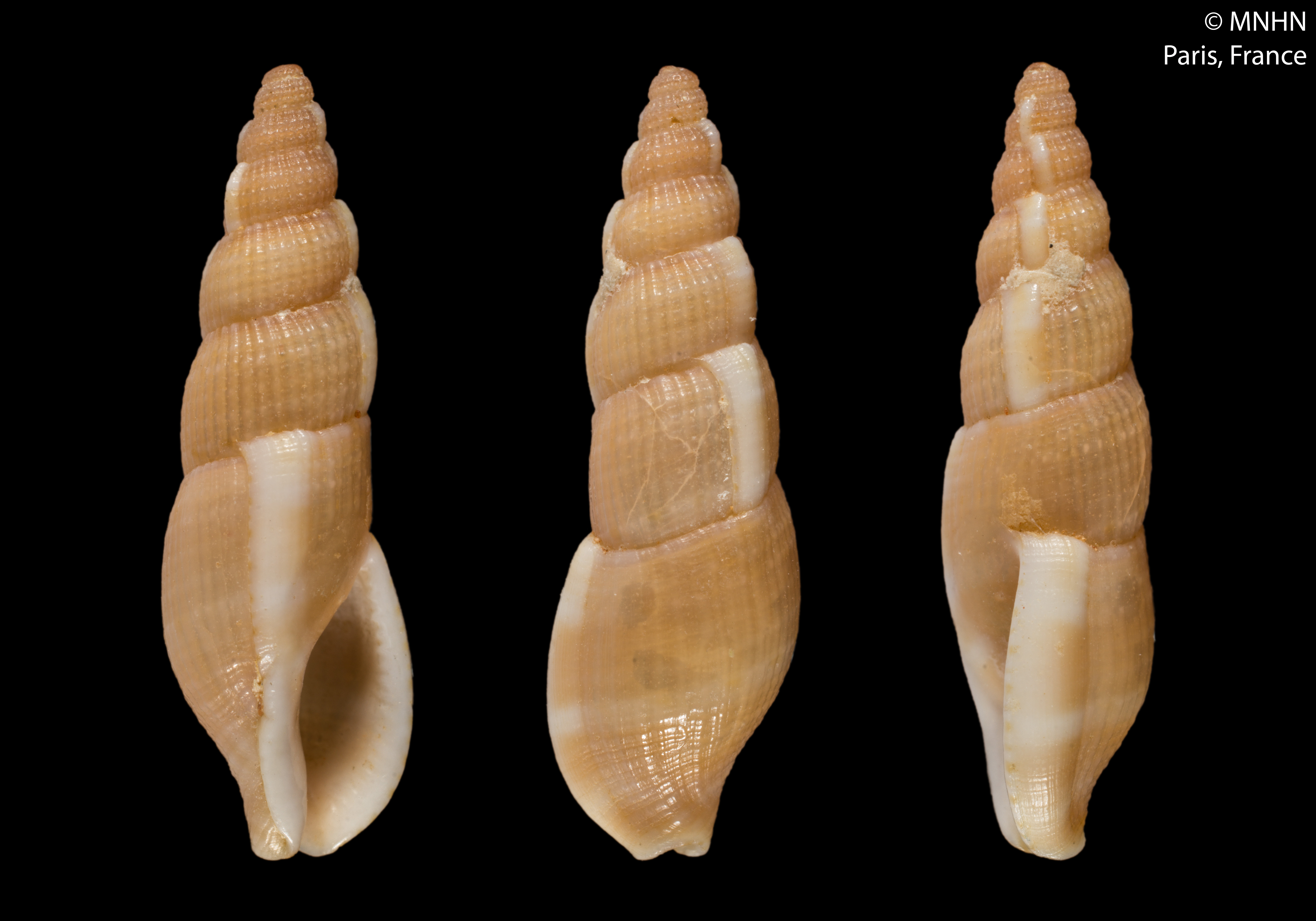
- Shell of Cumia simonis (holotype at MNHN, Paris)

Scientific classification
- Kingdom: Animalia
- Phylum: Mollusca
- Class: Gastropoda
- Subclass: Caenogastropoda
- Order: Neogastropoda
- Family: Colubrariidae
- Genus: Cumia
- Species: C. simonis

Binomial name
- Cumia simonis Bozzetti, 2004

Synonyms
- Fusus simonis Bozzetti, 2004

= Cumia simonis =

Species of gastropod

Cumia simonis is a rare species of sea snail, a marine gastropod mollusk in the family Colubrariidae.

== Description ==
The size of the shell ranges from 15 mm to 20 mm.

== Distribution ==
This species is found in the Indian Ocean off Madagascar.
