= Cumia schoutanica =

Scientific classification
- Kingdom: Animalia
- Phylum: Mollusca
- Class: Gastropoda
- Subclass: Caenogastropoda
- Order: Neogastropoda
- Family: Colubrariidae
- Genus: Cumia
- Species: C. schoutanica

Binomial name
- Cumia schoutanica (May 1910)

Synonyms
- Fusus schoutanicus (May 1910); Pisania schoutanicus May 1910

Species of gastropod

Cumia schoutanica is a species of sea snail, a marine gastropod mollusk in the family Colubrariidae. It is also sometimes referred to as Pisania schoutanica. The species was first described in May 1911.

== Key characteristics ==
The shell size varies between 15 and 31 mm (0.59 and 1.22 in).

- Kingdom: Animalia
- Phylum: Mollusca
- Class: Gastropoda
- Order: Neogastropoda
- Family: Colubrariidae
- Genus: Cumia.

== Distribution ==
This species is distributed in Australian waters along Queensland, Victoria and Tasmania.

It is an extant species, meaning it's both recognized and living today.

While Cumia species are marine and often associated with seafloor environments, specific depth data for C. schoutanica isn't readily available in literature. However, related taxa in Colubrariidae are typically found in subtidal to offshore sandy or muddy substrates.
