= Cumia clavula =

Scientific classification
- Kingdom: Animalia
- Phylum: Mollusca
- Class: Gastropoda
- Subclass: Caenogastropoda
- Order: Neogastropoda
- Family: Colubrariidae
- Genus: Cumia
- Species: C. clavula

Binomial name
- Cumia clavula Watters, 2009

Species of gastropod

Cumia clavula is a species of sea snail, a marine gastropod mollusc in the family Buccinidae, the true whelks.
