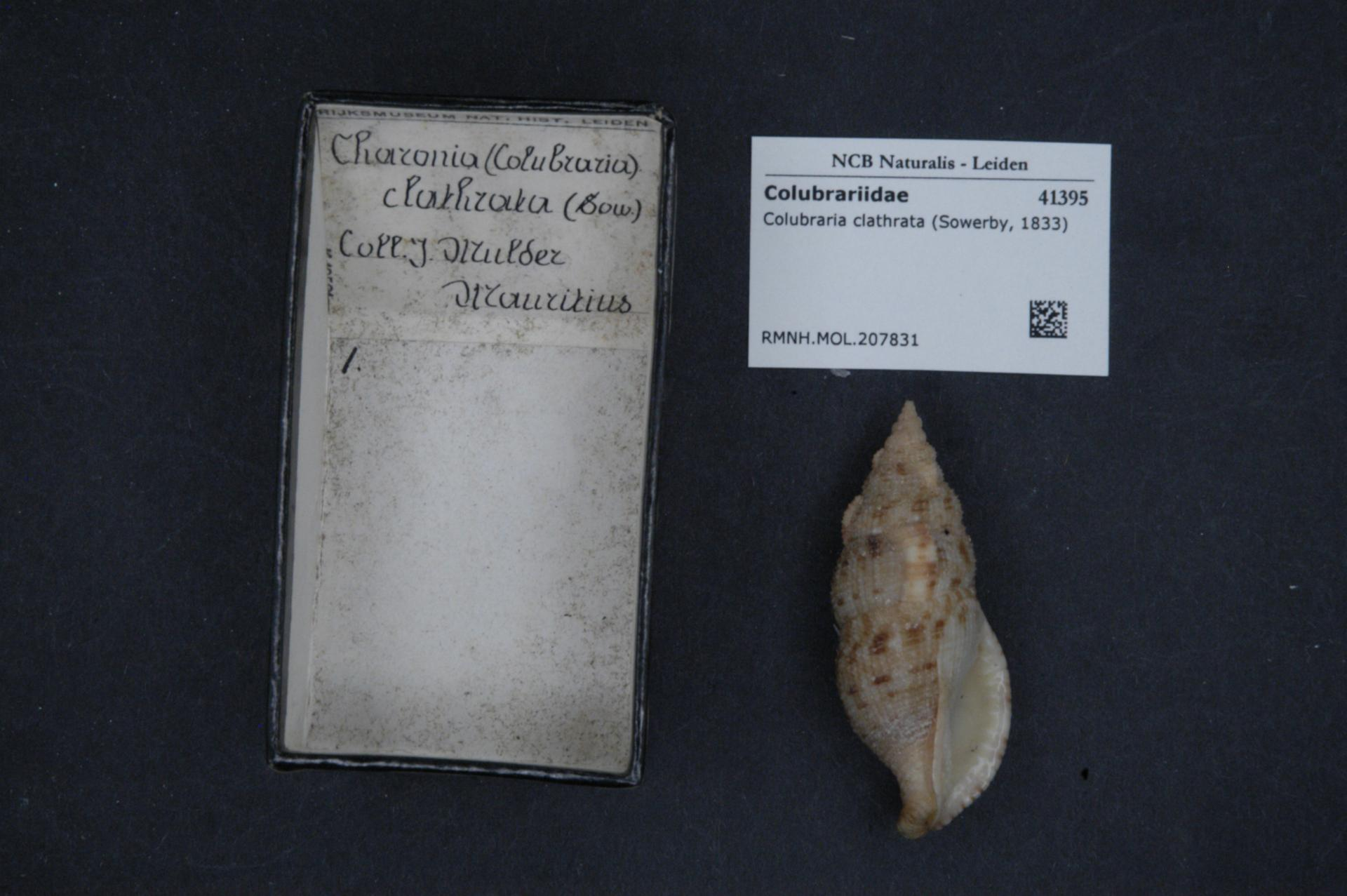

Scientific classification
- Kingdom: Animalia
- Phylum: Mollusca
- Class: Gastropoda
- Subclass: Caenogastropoda
- Order: Neogastropoda
- Family: Colubrariidae
- Genus: Colubraria
- Species: C. clathrata

Binomial name
- Colubraria clathrata (Sowerby, 1833)

= Colubraria clathrata =

Species of gastropod

Colubraria clathrata is a species of sea snail, a marine gastropod mollusk in the family Colubrariidae.
