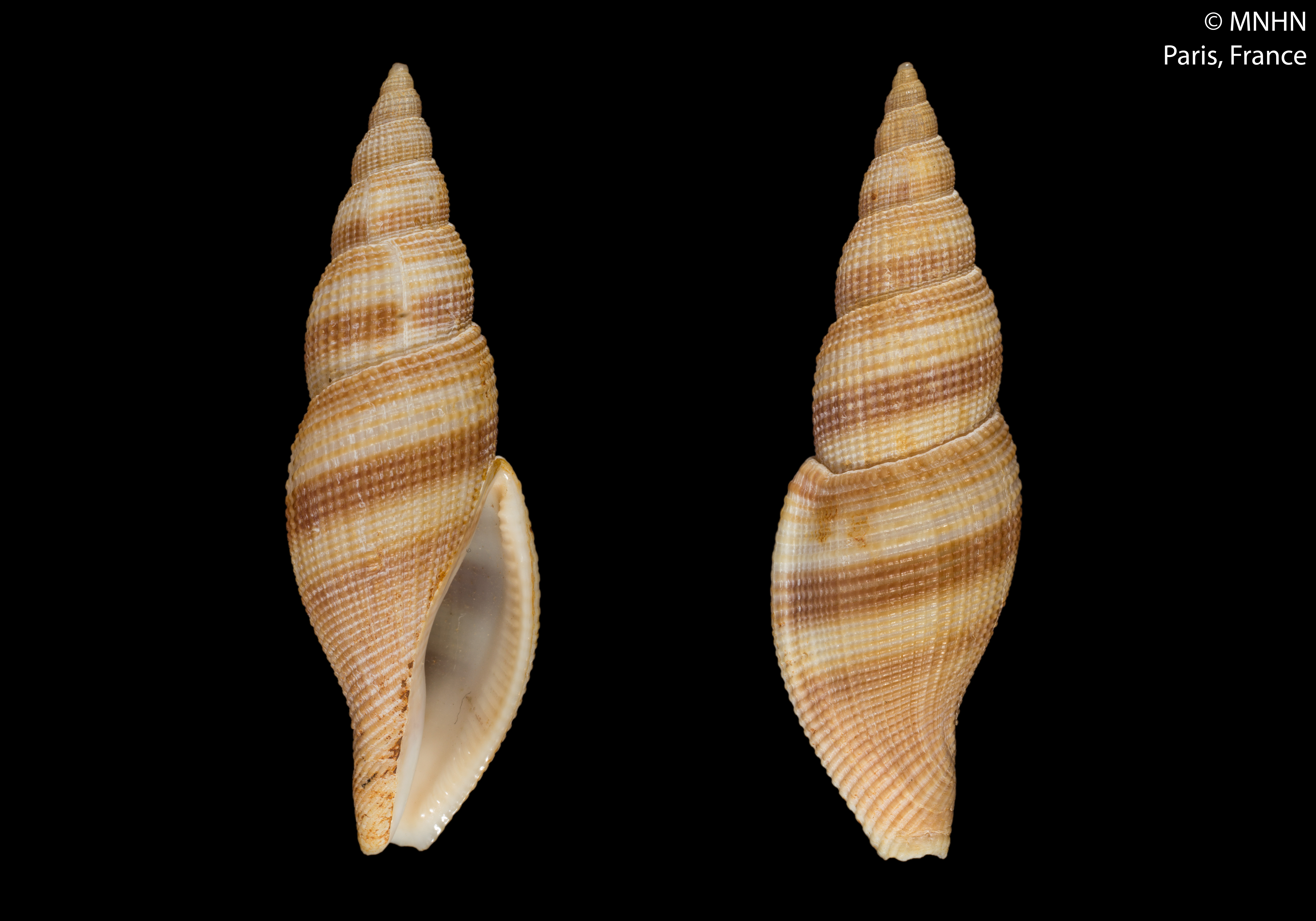
- Shell of Metula africana (holotype at MNHN, Paris)

Scientific classification
- Kingdom: Animalia
- Phylum: Mollusca
- Class: Gastropoda
- Subclass: Caenogastropoda
- Order: Neogastropoda
- Superfamily: Buccinoidea
- Family: Colubrariidae
- Genus: Metula; H. Adams & A. Adams, 1853

Type species
- Buccinum clathratum A. Adams & Reeve, 1850

Synonyms
- Acamptochetus Cossmann, 1901; Agassitula Olsson & Bayer, 1972; Antemetula Rehder, 1943; Antimitra Iredale, 1917; Colubrarina Kuroda & Habe in Kuroda, Habe & Oyama, 1971; Floritula Olsson & Bayer, 1972; Minitula Olsson & Bayer, 1972; Mitromorpha (Antimitra) Iredale, 1917

= Metula (gastropod) =

Genus of gastropods

Metula is a genus of sea snails, marine gastropod molluscs in the family Colubrariidae.

== Description ==
(Described as Acamptochetus) The shells are elongate-ovate to fusiformly elongate. The sculpture is generally cancellate, although spiral elements may predominate. The sutures bear a smooth or cingulate spiral thread, and the whorls frequently show flat, adpressed, and often obsolete growth varices. The aperture is narrow and fusiform. The outer lip is finely or obsoletely denticulate. The columella carries a smooth, narrow callus, and the siphonal canal is moderately short.

== Fossil records ==
This genus is known in the fossil records from the Paleocene to the Quaternary (age range: from 61.7 to 0.781 million years ago).

== Species ==
Species in the genus Metula include:

- Metula aegrota (Reeve, 1845)
- Metula africana Bouchet, 1988
- Metula agaoensis S.-I Huang & M.-H. Lin, 2019
- Metula amosi Vanatta, 1913
- Metula andamanica Smith, 1906
- Metula angioyorum Parth, 1992
- Metula bozzettii Parth, 1990
- Metula crosnieri Bouchet, 1988
- Metula cumingi A. Adams, 1853
- Metula daphnelloides Melville & Standen, 1903
- Metula ellena Olsson & Bayer, 1972
- Metula elongata Dall, 1907
- Metula etelvinae Bozzetti, 2001
- Metula eureka S.-I Huang & M.-H. Lin, 2019
- Metula frausseni Bozzetti, 1995
- Metula gigliottii Coltro, 2005
- Metula inflata (Houbrick, 1984)
- Metula kilburni Parth, 1994
- Metula knudseni Kilburn, 1975
- Metula lintea Guppy, 1882
- Metula metula (Hinds, 1844)
- Metula metulina (Kuroda & Habe in Kuroda, Habe & Oyama, 1971)
- Metula minor Olsson & Bayer, 1972
- Metula mitrella (A. Adams & Reeve, 1850)
- Metula mozambicana S.-I Huang & M.-H. Lin, 2019
- Metula olssoni Woodring, 1928
- Metula optima Olsson & Bayer, 1972
- Metula parthi Bondarev, 1997
- Metula reticularis Traub, 1938
- Metula sulcata S.-Q. Zhang, J.-L. Zhang & S.-P. Zhang, 2016
- Metula thachi Fraussen & S.-I. Huang, 2011
- Metula tumida Xiutong & Suping, 2000

Species brought into synonymy

- Metula agassizi Clench & Aguayo, 1941: synonym of Bartschia agassizi (Clench & Aguayo, 1941) (original combination)
- Metula anfractura Matthews & Rios, 1968: synonym of Bartschia agassizi (Clench & Aguayo, 1941)
- Metula boswellae Kilburn, 1975: synonym of Kanamarua boswellae (Kilburn, 1975) (original combination)
- Metula canetae (Clench & Aguayo, 1944): synonym of Gaillea canetae (Clench & Aguayo, 1944)
- Metula chetyzecchiae Bozzetti, 1992: synonym of Metula metulina (Kuroda & Habe, 1971)
- Metula clathrata (A. Adams & Reeve, 1850): synonym of Metula knudseni Kilburn, 1975 (based on junior primary homonym)
- Metula clathrata Knudsen, 1956: synonym of Metula africana Bouchet, 1988 (secondary homonym of M. clathrata (Adams & Reeve, 1850))
- Metula fusiformis Clench & Aguayo, 1941: synonym of Manaria fusiformis (Clench & Aguayo, 1941) (original combination)
- Metula guppyi Olsson & Bayer, 1972: synonym of Bartschia guppyi (Olsson & Bayer, 1972) (original combination)
- Metula hindsii H. Adams & A. Adams, 1858: synonym of Metula metula (Hinds, 1844) (unnecessary substitute name for Buccinum metula, established to avoid tautonymy)
- Metula rehderi (Kilburn, 1977): synonym of Kanamarua hyatinthus Shikama, 1973
- Metula significans (Rehder, 1943) : synonym of Bartschia significans Rehder, 1943
- Metula somalica Bozzetti, 1993: synonym of Kanamarua somalica (Bozzetti, 1993) (original combination)
- Metula vicdani Kosuge, 1989: synonym of Kanamarua hyatinthus Shikama, 1973
