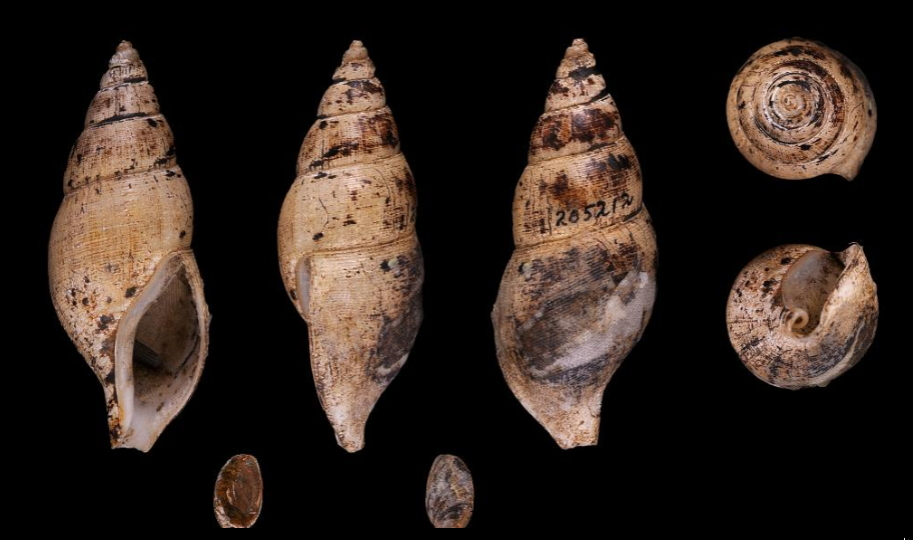
- Shell of Kanamarua adonis (specimen at the Smithsonian Institution)

Scientific classification
- Kingdom: Animalia
- Phylum: Mollusca
- Class: Gastropoda
- Subclass: Caenogastropoda
- Order: Neogastropoda
- Superfamily: Buccinoidea
- Family: Colubrariidae
- Genus: Kanamarua
- Species: K. adonis

Binomial name
- Kanamarua adonis (Dall, 1919)

Synonyms
- Colus adonis Dall, 1919 ·; Conus (Aulacofusus) adonis Dall, 1919 (original combination)

= Kanamarua adonis =

Species of gastropod

Kanamarua adonis is a species of sea snail, a marine gastropod mollusk in the family Colubrariidae.

== Description ==
(Original description as Conus (Aulacofusus) adonis) The small shell measures 37 mm. It is bulimiform, thin, whitish with a pale olive periostracum. The shell contains about six whorls, exclusive of the (lost) protoconch. It has a very narrowly channeled suture and moderately rounded whorls. The spiral sculpture consists of narrow equal flat threads (about three to a millimeter) with very narrow interspaces over the whole shell, though the interspaces are a little wider on the apical whorls and the spirals under-run there by thread-like axial sculpture, giving a somev/hat punctate appearance under magnification. The aperture is elongate and rather narrow. The outer lip is thickened, not reflected, with traces of liration near the inside margin. The body and the columella contain a continuous layer of enamel. The siphonal canal is short and wide. It has no siphonal fascicle.

== Distribution ==
This marine species occurs in Suruga Gulf, Japan.
