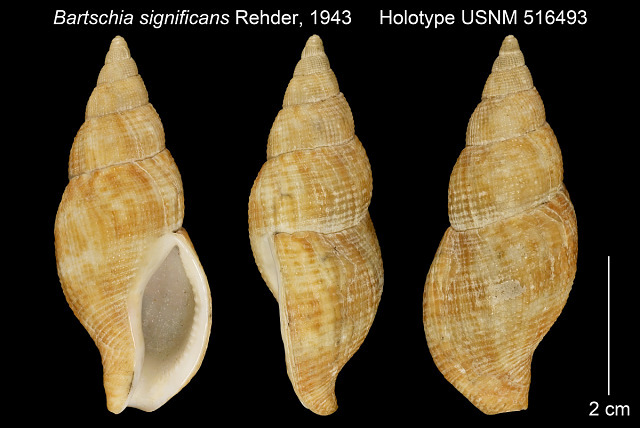

Scientific classification
- Kingdom: Animalia
- Phylum: Mollusca
- Class: Gastropoda
- Subclass: Caenogastropoda
- Order: Neogastropoda
- Family: Colubrariidae
- Genus: Bartschia
- Species: B. significans

Binomial name
- Bartschia significans Rehder, 1943

Synonyms
- Metula significans (Rehder, 1943)

= Bartschia significans =

Species of gastropod

Bartschia significans is a species of sea snail, a marine gastropod mollusc in the family Colubrariidae.

== Description ==
The length of the shell varies between 40 mm and 55 mm.

== Distribution ==
This species is distributed in the Gulf of Mexico.
