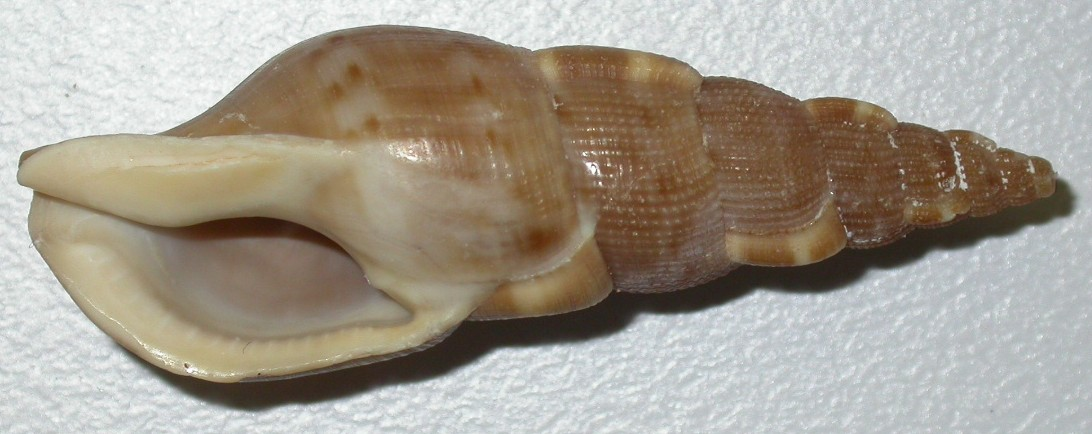
- Apertural view of a shell of Cumia brazieri

Scientific classification
- Kingdom: Animalia
- Phylum: Mollusca
- Class: Gastropoda
- Subclass: Caenogastropoda
- Order: Neogastropoda
- Family: Colubrariidae
- Genus: Cumia
- Species: C. brazieri

Binomial name
- Cumia brazieri (Angas, 1869)

Synonyms
- Fusus brazieri (Angas, 1869); Tritonium brazieri Angas, 1869; Colubraria brazieri (Angas, 1869)

= Cumia brazieri =

Species of gastropod

Cumia brazieri is a species of sea snail, a marine gastropod mollusk in the family Colubrariidae, the spindle snails, the tulip snails and their allies.

== Description ==
The shell size is up to 70 mm

== Distribution ==
This species occurs off Queensland and New South Wales, Australia
