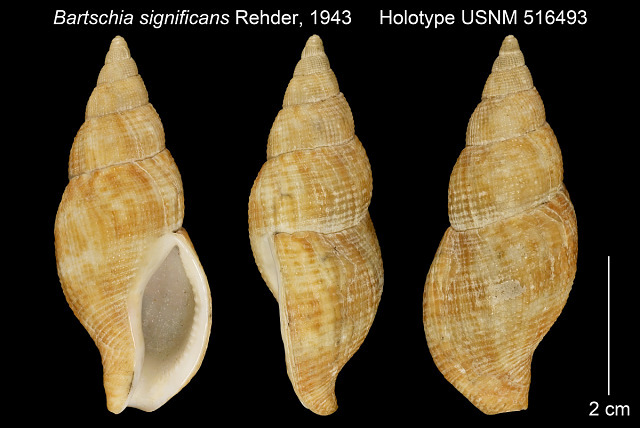
- Bartschia significans

Scientific classification
- Kingdom: Animalia
- Phylum: Mollusca
- Class: Gastropoda
- Subclass: Caenogastropoda
- Order: Neogastropoda
- Superfamily: Buccinoidea
- Family: Colubrariidae
- Genus: Bartschia; Rehder, 1943

Type species
- Bartschia significans Rehder, 1943

Synonyms
- Bartschia (Agassitula) Olsson & Bayer, 1972· accepted, alternate representation; Bartschia (Bartschia) Rehder, 1943· accepted, alternate representation

= Bartschia =

Genus of gastropods

Bartschia is a genus of sea snails, marine gastropod mollusks in the family Colubrariidae.

== Species ==
Species within the genus Bartschia include:

- Bartschia agassizi Clench & Aguayo, 1941
- Bartschia frumari Garcia, 2008
- Bartschia guppyi (Olsson & Bayer, 1972)
- Bartschia peartae Harasewych, 2014
- Bartschia significans Rehder, 1943

Species brought into synonymy

- Bartschia canetae Clench & Aguayo, 1944: synonym of Eosipho canetae (Clench & Aguayo, 1944)
- Bartschia fusiformis (Clench & Aguayo, 1941): synonym of Manaria fusiformis (Clench & Aguayo, 1941)
- Bartschia taiwanensis K. Y. Lai & B. S. Jung, 2012: synonym of Belomitra brachytoma (Schepman, 1913)
