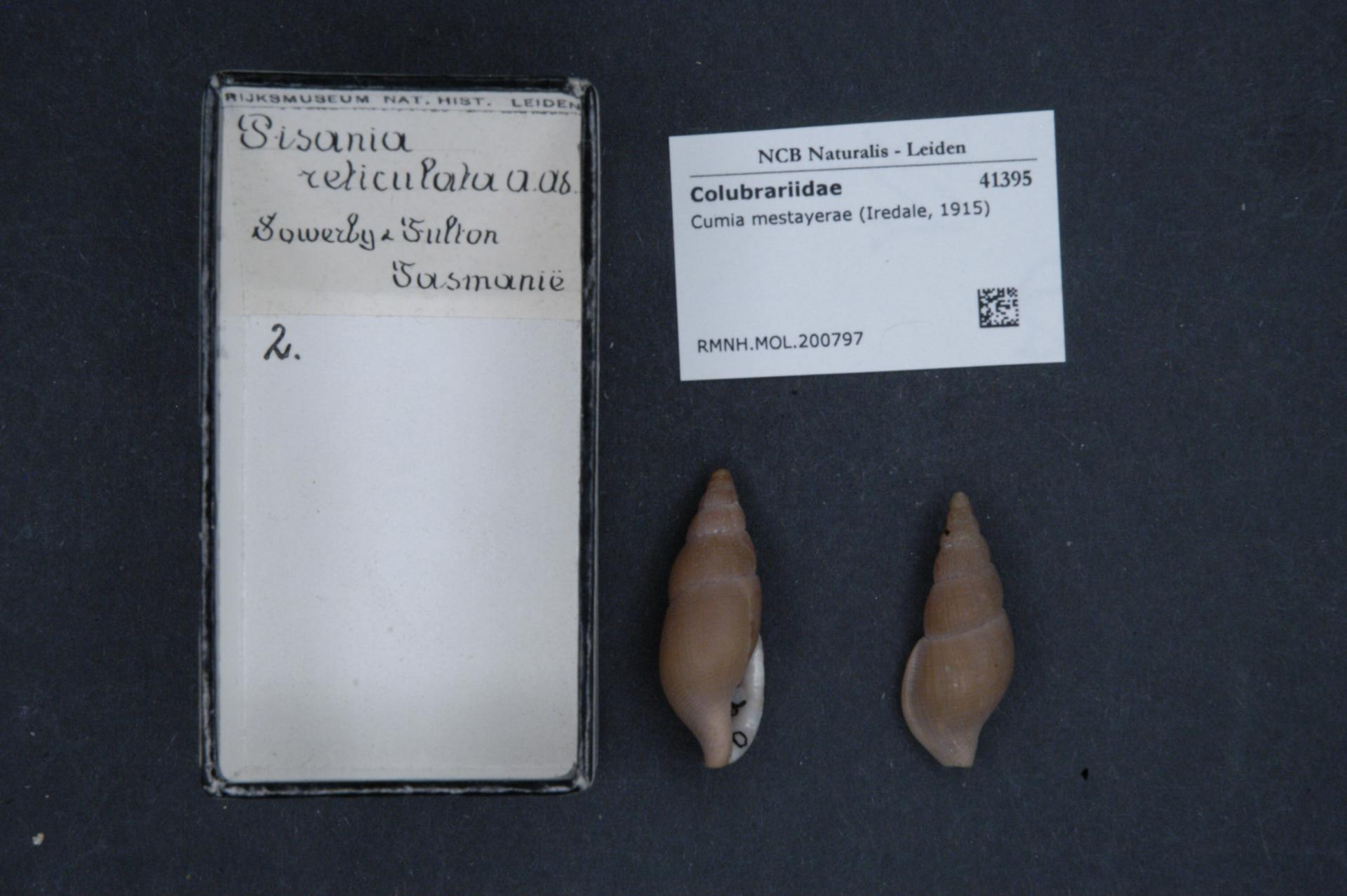

Scientific classification
- Kingdom: Animalia
- Phylum: Mollusca
- Class: Gastropoda
- Subclass: Caenogastropoda
- Order: Neogastropoda
- Family: Colubrariidae
- Genus: Cumia
- Species: C. mestayerae

Binomial name
- Cumia mestayerae (Iredale, 1915)

Synonyms
- Cumia reticulata (A. Adams, 1855); Pisania reticulata Adams, A., 1855; Pisania reticulata Adams, A., 1855 Iredale, 1915; Ratifusus mestayerae (Iredale, 1915)

= Cumia mestayerae =

Species of gastropod

Cumia mestayerae is a species of sea snail, a marine gastropod mollusk in the family Colubrariidae. It can reach up to 30 mm in length.

== Description ==
The shell size varies between 20 mm and 30 mm

== Distribution ==
This species is distributed in the seas along Southern Australia and New Zealand.
