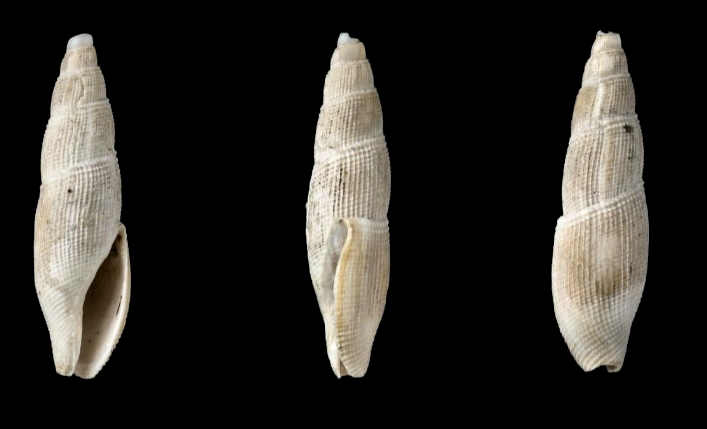
- Shell of Metula mitrella (lectotype at the Natural History Museum, London)

Scientific classification
- Kingdom: Animalia
- Phylum: Mollusca
- Class: Gastropoda
- Subclass: Caenogastropoda
- Order: Neogastropoda
- Family: Colubrariidae
- Genus: Metula
- Species: M. mitrella

Binomial name
- Metula mitrella (A. Adams & Reeve, 1850)

Synonyms
- Acamptochetus mitrella (A. Adams & Reeve, 1850); Antemetula mitrella (A. Adams & Reeve, 1850); Buccinum mitrella A. Adams & Reeve, 1850 superseded combination

= Metula mitrella =

Species of gastropod

Metula mitrella is a species of sea snail, a marine gastropod mollusk in the family Colubrariidae, the true whelks.

== Description ==
(Described as Acamptochetus mitrella) This species conforms well to the generic characters of Metula. The sculpture consists of fine spiral and axial threads, with approximately 25 spiral cords on the penultimate whorl and about 50 on the body whorl. The sutures are bordered by a fine cingulate thread, and the aperture is narrow and fusiform. The labial denticles are small but slightly elongate, and the columella is calloused and smooth. The protoconch comprises three smooth whorls, and the teleoconch consists of six to seven whorls. The whorls bear flat, adpressed, and sometimes obsolete growth varices, which are generally spaced at intervals of 80° to 100°, except on the body whorl, where typically only the labial varix is present.

== Distribution ==
This marine species occurs in the South China Sea, off Taiwan, the Philippines and Indonesia.
