= Iredalula =

Scientific classification
- Kingdom: Animalia
- Phylum: Mollusca
- Class: Gastropoda
- Subclass: Caenogastropoda
- Order: Neogastropoda
- Family: Colubrariidae
- Genus: Iredalula; Finlay, 1926

Type species
- † Bela striata Hutton, 1873

Genus of gastropods

Iredalula is a genus of sea snails, marine gastropod mollusks in the family Colubrariidae.

== Species ==
Species within the genus Iredalula include:

- Iredalula alticincta (Murdoch & Suter, 1906)
- Iredalula groschi Fraussen & Monsecour, 2007
- † Iredalula striata (Hutton, 1873)

Species brought into synonymy

- Iredalula venusta Powell, 1934 : synonym of Iredalula alticincta (Murdoch & Suter, 1906)
