= Minibraria =

Scientific classification
- Kingdom: Animalia
- Phylum: Mollusca
- Class: Gastropoda
- Subclass: Caenogastropoda
- Order: Neogastropoda
- Family: Colubrariidae
- Genus: Minibraria; Sarasua, 1984

Genus of gastropods

Minibraria is a genus of sea snails, marine gastropod mollusks in the family Colubrariidae.

== Species ==
Species within the genus Minibraria include:

- Minibraria monroei (McGinty, 1962)
