= Bartschia agassizi =

Scientific classification
- Kingdom: Animalia
- Phylum: Mollusca
- Class: Gastropoda
- Subclass: Caenogastropoda
- Order: Neogastropoda
- Family: Colubrariidae
- Genus: Bartschia
- Species: B. agassizi

Binomial name
- Bartschia agassizi (Clench & Aguayo, 1941)

Synonyms
- Bartschia (Agassitula) agassizi (Clench & Aguayo, 1941)· accepted, alternate representation; Metula agassizi Clench & Aguayo, 1941 (original combination); Metula anfractura Matthews & Rios, 1968

Species of gastropod

Bartschia agassizi is a species of sea snail, a marine gastropod mollusc in the family Colubrariidae.

== Distribution ==
This marine species occurs in the Gulf of Mexico, Cuba and Mexico.
