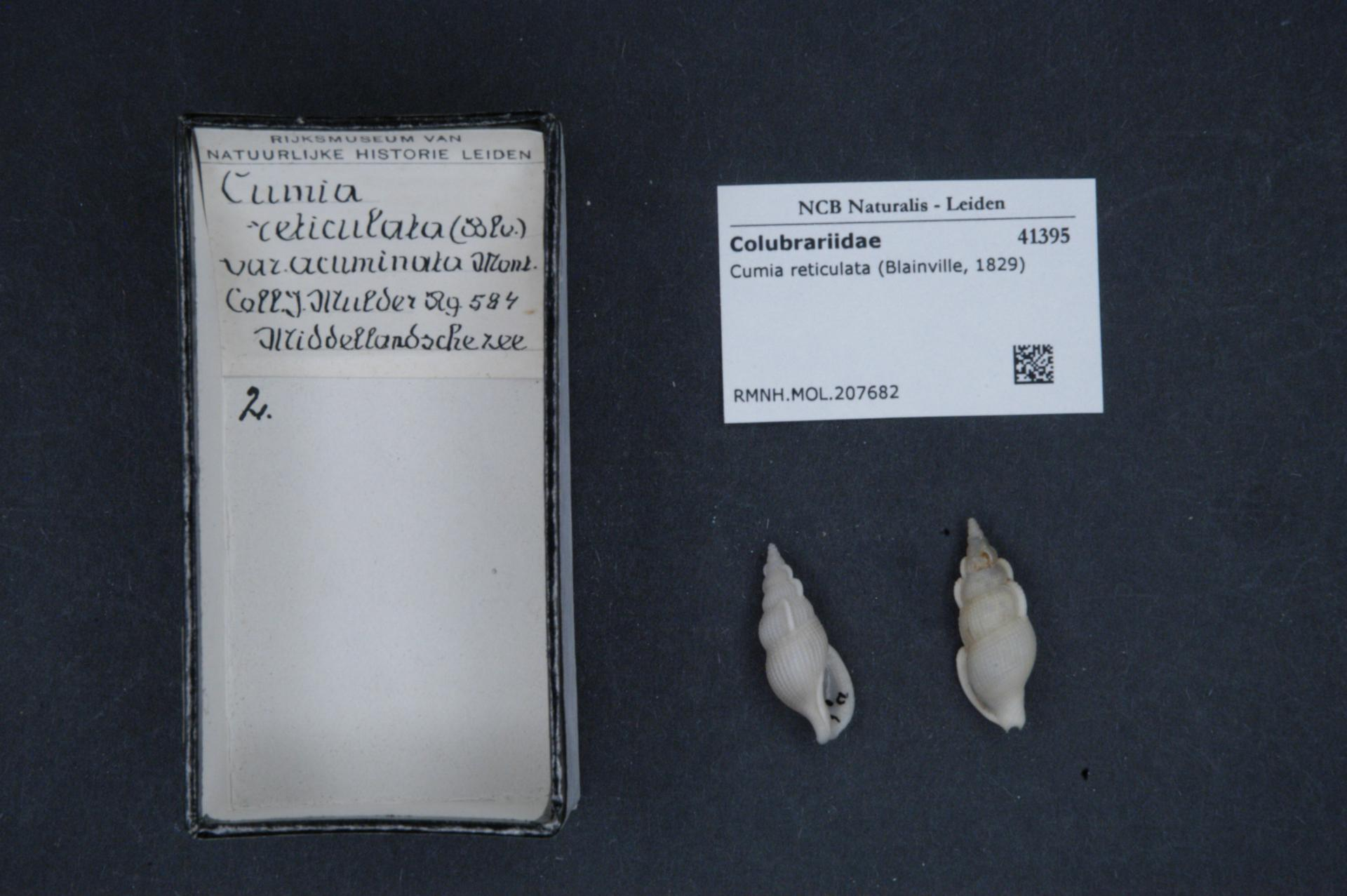
- Shells of Cumia reticulata

Scientific classification
- Kingdom: Animalia
- Phylum: Mollusca
- Class: Gastropoda
- Subclass: Caenogastropoda
- Order: Neogastropoda
- Family: Colubrariidae
- Genus: Cumia
- Species: C. reticulata

Binomial name
- Cumia reticulata (Blainville, 1829)

Synonyms
- Colubraria reticulata (Blainville, 1829); Colubraria reticulata var. profundorum Ardovini, 2014 (unavailable name: established as a variety after 1960); Colubraria reticulata var. spongiarum (Kobelt, 1901); Cumia decussata Bivona-Bernardi, 1838; Epidromus reticulatus (Blainville, 1829); Epidromus reticulatus var. albina Monterosato, 1880; Epidromus reticulatus var. atra Monterosato, 1880; Epidromus reticulatus var. fasciata Monterosato, 1880; Epidromus reticulatus var. fulva Monterosato, 1880; Epidromus reticulatus var. minor Monterosato, 1880; Epidromus reticulatus var. nivea Monterosato, 1880; Epidromus reticulatus var. spongiarum Kobelt, 1901; Fusus intertextus (Helbling, 1779); Murex (Fusus) intertextus Helbling, 1779; Murex calfius Brusina, 1870; Triton mediterraneum Sowerby G.B. II, 1833; Triton reticulatum Blainville 1829; Triton turricolatum Deshayes, 1835; Tritonium bonanni Delle Chiaje, 1830

= Cumia reticulata =

Species of gastropod

Cumia reticulata, common name the false triton, is a species of sea snail, a marine gastropod mollusk in the family Colubrariidae. In this family, there are at least 6 species that are known to feed on blood. The trait of feeding on blood is likely shared by the entire family.

It is commonly known as the vampire snail because it feeds on the blood of fish when they are asleep. Colubraria reticulata are commonly found in rocky and coral environments that are tropical or subtropical and temperate seas. They are found in the benthic zone, which is the ecological region at the lowest level of a body of water.

== Description ==
Members of the Neogastropoda are mostly gonochoric and broadcast spawners. These snails also asexually reproduce. The lifecycle of these snails start off as embryos that develop into planktonic trochophore larvae. After the larval stage, they evolve into juvenile veligers before becoming fully grown adults. The length of the shell varies between 10 mm and 64 mm.

== Distribution ==
The type is mostly found in Sicily, Italy. It also occurs off West Africa and in the southwest Mediterranean Sea and are not considered as a widely dispersed species.

== Feeding habits ==
The vampire snail feeds at night when fishes are asleep. Their mouthpart can slice flesh like tiny scalpels. At the end of their mouth is a mounted proboscis. These snails possess a long thin proboscis to feed on the blood of fish. Once contact is made between the proboscis and the skin of the fish, the proboscis extends its length to gain access to the blood vessel. Their proboscis can stretch 3 times its body length and therefore allows them to bypass many fishes defenses to blood sucking, such as the Parrot fish's mucus sleeping bag.

=== Secretion of bioactive molecules ===
Upon contact with the skin, anesthetic is secreted to numb the area. Colubraria reticulata secretes chemicals that disrupts the process of blood clotting and wound healing. Common anesthetics from protein families ShK, Turripeptide, ADA, and CAP-ShK were found to be present during hematophagy. In addition, anticoagulants such as PS1, Meprin, and Kunitz were also present to prevent blood clotting. The anticoagulants are active until the blood is fully digested. These snails have secondary glands in the oesophagus that secrete proteins to keep the blood liquified in their guts. Furthermore, vasopressors were found and because the proboscis is thin, it is therefore possible that the snail increases blood pressure to allow maximization of blood income and feeding time. This is significant because without vasopressors, the snail cannot suck blood efficiently.

Turritoxin, which is unique to the vampire snail, is also produced by coneshell. Although the function of turritoxin is specifically unknown to the vampire snail, scientists have looked towards coneshell and hypothesized that the use of turritoxin is of the same manner.
