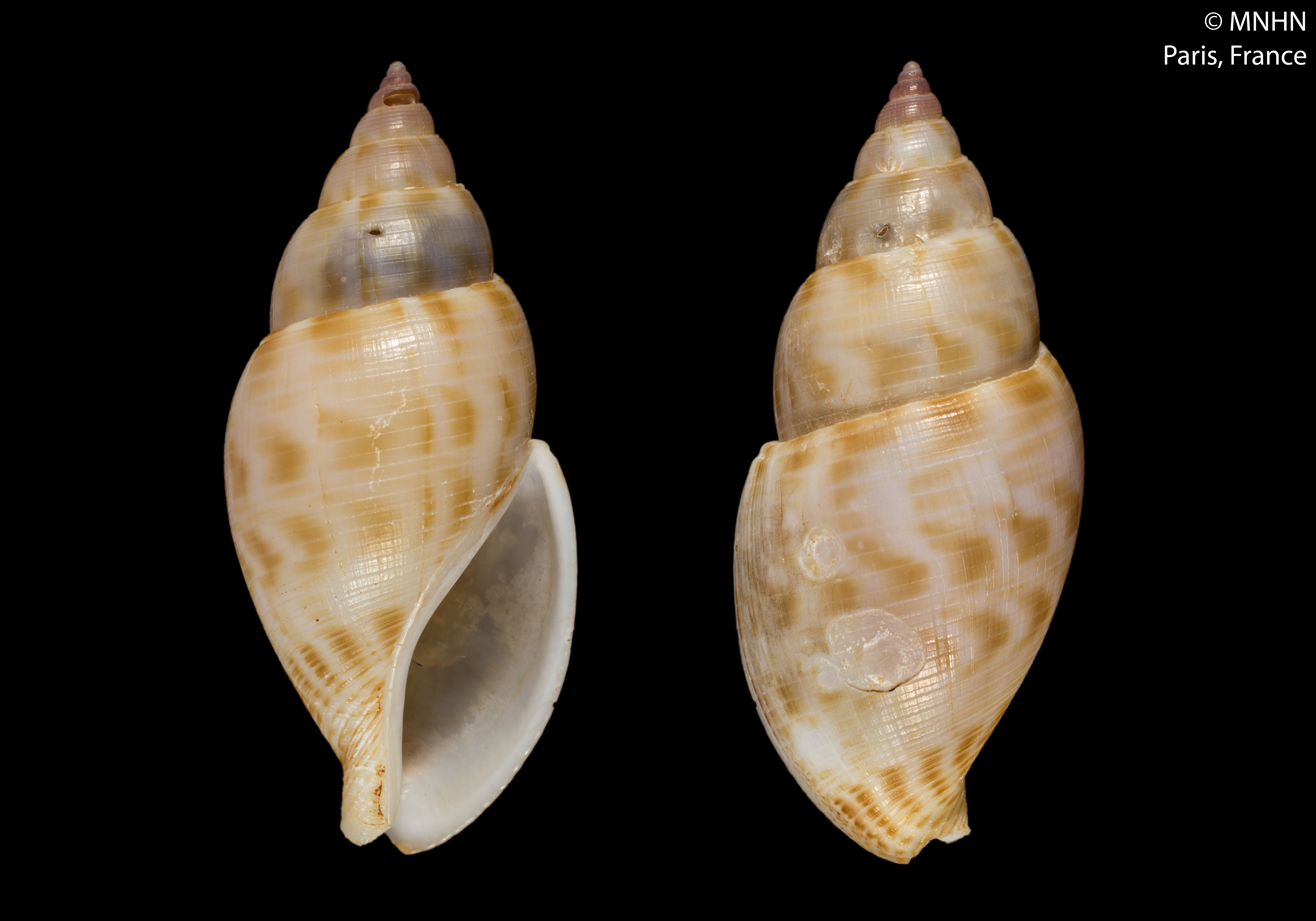
- Shell of Kanamarua francroberti

Scientific classification
- Kingdom: Animalia
- Phylum: Mollusca
- Class: Gastropoda
- Subclass: Caenogastropoda
- Order: Neogastropoda
- Superfamily: Buccinoidea
- Family: Colubrariidae
- Genus: Kanamarua; Kuroda, 1951

Type species
- Colus adonis Dall, 1919

= Kanamarua =

Genus of gastropods

Kanamarua is a genus of sea snails, marine gastropod mollusks in the family Colubrariidae.

== Species ==
Species within the genus Kanamarua include:

- Kanamarua adonis (Dall, 1919)
- Kanamarua aikeni Fraussen & D. Monsecour, 2019
- Kanamarua boswellae (Kilburn, 1975)
- Kanamarua francroberti Fraussen & Lamy, 2008
- Kanamarua hyatinthus Shikama, 1973
- Kanamarua magnifica Fraussen & Chino, 2012
- Kanamarua narcissisma Fraussen & Lamy, 2008
- Kanamarua somalica (Bozzetti, 1993)
- Kanamarua tazimai Kuroda, 1951
- Kanamarua wangae D. Monsecour, Fraussen & Fei, 2017

Species brought into synonymy

- Kanamarua rehderi Kilburn, 1977: synonym of Kanamarua hyatinthus Shikama, 1973
