= Cumia antillana =

Scientific classification
- Kingdom: Animalia
- Phylum: Mollusca
- Class: Gastropoda
- Subclass: Caenogastropoda
- Order: Neogastropoda
- Family: Colubrariidae
- Genus: Cumia
- Species: C. antillana

Binomial name
- Cumia antillana (Sarasúa, 1978)

Synonyms
- Colubraria antillana Sarasúa, 1978 (original combination)

Species of gastropod

Cumia antillana is a species of sea snail, a marine gastropod mollusk in the family Colubrariidae.

== Distribution ==
This species occurs in the Caribbean Sea and in the Gulf of Mexico.
