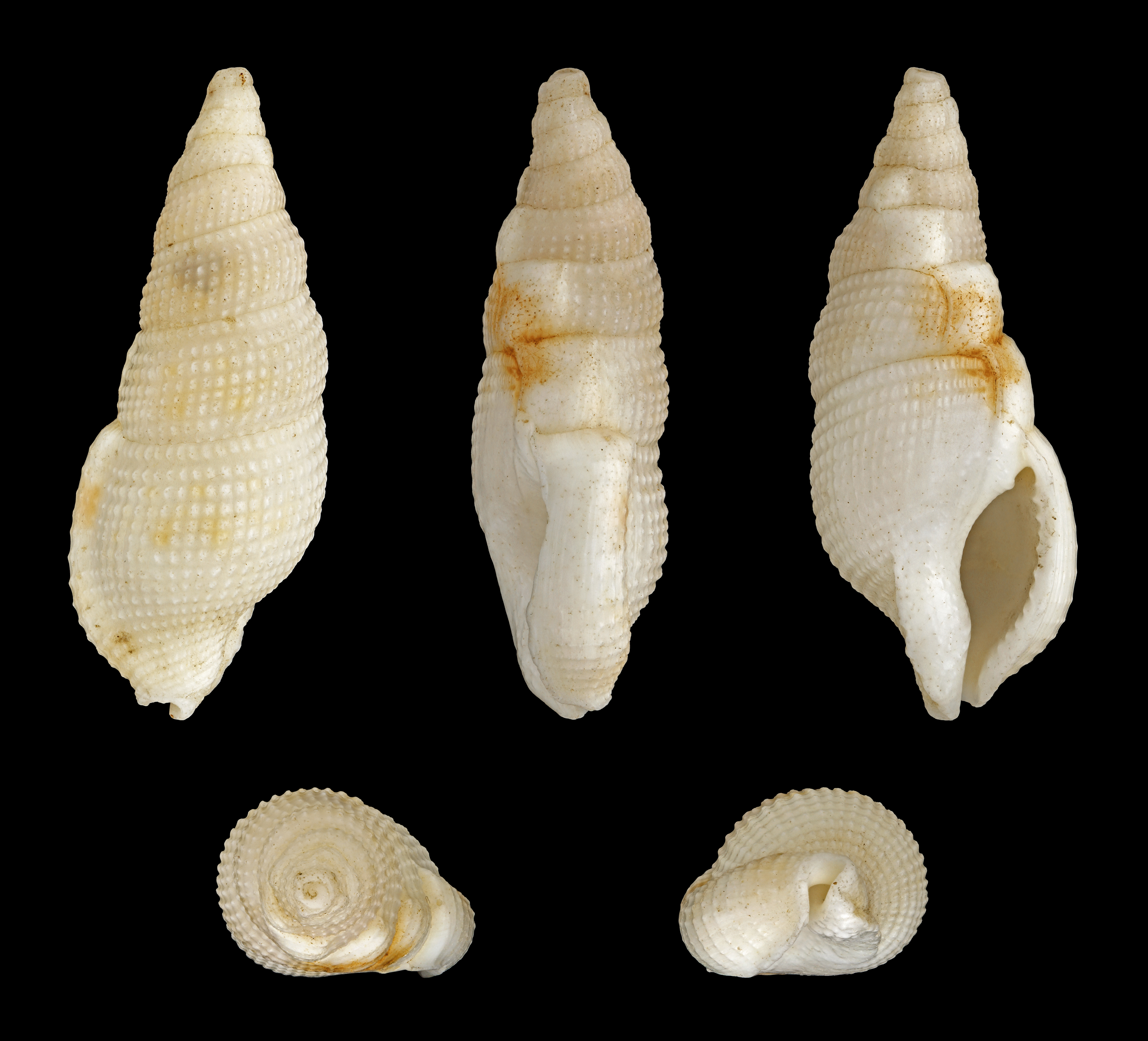
- Five views of a shell of Colubraria tortuosa (Reeve, 1844)

Scientific classification
- Kingdom: Animalia
- Phylum: Mollusca
- Class: Gastropoda
- Subclass: Caenogastropoda
- Order: Neogastropoda
- Superfamily: Buccinoidea
- Family: Colubrariidae; Dall, 1904

Synonyms
- Fusidae Iredale, 1915

= Colubrariidae =

Family of gastropods

Colubrariidae are a taxonomic family of medium-sized sea snails, marine gastropod mollusks in the superfamily Buccinoidea. This family has no subfamilies.

== Genera ==
- Axifex S.-I Huang & M.-H. Lin, 2019
- Bartschia Rehder, 1943
- Colubraria Schumacher, 1817
- Cumia Bivona-Bernardi, 1838
- Cyclimetula S.-I Huang & M.-H. Lin, 2019
- Iredalula Finlay, 1926
- Kanamarua Kuroda, 1951
- Metula H. Adams & A. Adams, 1853
- Minibraria Sarasúa, 1984
- † Pseudometula Garvie, 1996

Genera brought into synonymy

- Acamptochetus Cossmann, 1901: synonym of Metula H. Adams & A. Adams, 1853
- Agassitula Olsson & Bayer, 1972: synonym of Bartschia Rehder, 1943
- Antemetula Rehder, 1943: synonym of Metula H. Adams & A. Adams, 1853
- Antimitra Iredale, 1917: synonym of Metula H. Adams & A. Adams, 1853
- Colubrarina Kuroda & Habe, 1971: synonym of Metula H. Adams & A. Adams, 1853
- Epidromus Mörch, 1852: synonym of Colubraria Schumacher, 1817 (not available from Agassiz, 1846)
- Floritula Olsson & Bayer, 1972: synonym of Metula H. Adams & A. Adams, 1853
- Fusus Helbling, 1779: synonym of Cumia Bivona, 1838 (Invalid: Placed by the ICZN on the Official Index by Opinion 1765, See Nomenclature note below.)
- Minitula Olsson & Bayer, 1972: synonym of Metula H. Adams & A. Adams, 1853
- Obex Iredale, 1925: synonym of Colubraria Schumacher, 1817
- Ratifusus Iredale, 1929: synonym of Cumia Bivona, 1838
- Roquesia Petuch, 2013: synonym of Colubraria Schumacher, 1817
