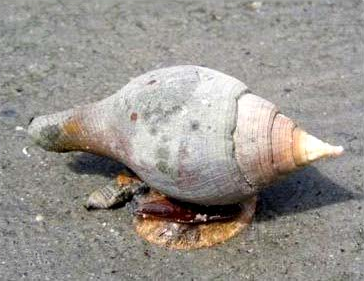
- A live individual of Turbinella laevigata

Scientific classification
- Kingdom: Animalia
- Phylum: Mollusca
- Class: Gastropoda
- Subclass: Caenogastropoda
- Order: Neogastropoda
- Superfamily: Turbinelloidea
- Family: Turbinellidae
- Subfamily: Turbinellinae; Swainson, 1835

= Turbinellinae =

Former subfamily of gastropods

Turbinellinae were a subfamily of large deepwater sea snails, marine gastropod mollusks in the family Turbinellidae.

This subfamily belonged to the family Turbinellidae within the clade Neogastropoda (according to the taxonomy of the Gastropoda by Bouchet & Rocroi, 2005). But in 2025 has been upgraded to the rank of family.

This was a small subfamily with only three genera and some 10 extant species described.

== Distribution ==
Species of this subfamily can be found in the Indian Ocean and in the Caribbean. The species Syrinx aruanus (Linnaeus, 1758), the largest living gastropod, is distributed along the coasts of Western and Northern Australia to Papua New Guinea.

== Description ==
Species in this family have thick-shelled, fusiform shells with conical-shaped whorls. The large body whorl ends in a long siphonal canal. The columella contains three to four plaits.

== Genera and species ==
Genera in the subfamily Turbinellinae include :

- Cryptofusus Beu, 2011
- Syrinx Röding, 1798
- Turbinella Lamarck, 1799

Genus brought into synonymy

- Buccinella Perry, 1811 : synonym of Turbinella Lamarck, 1799
