= Pleia =

Scientific classification
- Kingdom: Animalia
- Phylum: Mollusca
- Class: Gastropoda
- Subclass: Caenogastropoda
- Order: Neogastropoda
- Family: Fasciolariidae
- Genus: Pleia; Finlay, 1930

Genus of gastropods

Pleia is a genus of sea snails, marine gastropod mollusks in the family Fasciolariidae, the spindle snails, the tulip snails and their allies.

== Species ==
Species within the genus Pleia include:

- Pleia cryptocarinata Dell, 1956: synonym of Cryptofusus cryptocarinatus (Dell, 1956)
