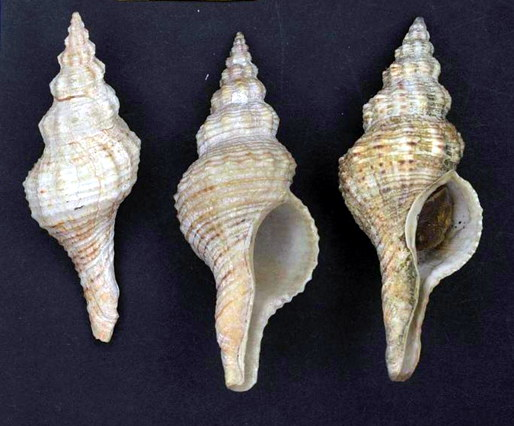
- Three views of a shell of Marmorofusus verrucosus (museum specimens at Naturalis Biodiversity Center)

Scientific classification
- Kingdom: Animalia
- Phylum: Mollusca
- Class: Gastropoda
- Subclass: Caenogastropoda
- Order: Neogastropoda
- Family: Fasciolariidae
- Genus: Marmorofusus
- Species: M. verrucosus

Binomial name
- Marmorofusus verrucosus (Gmelin, 1791)

Synonyms
- Fusinus marmoratus (Philippi, 1846); Fusinus verrucosus (Gmelin, 1791); Fusinus verrucosus var. buccinoida (Röding, 1798); Fusus marmoratus Philippi, 1846; Fusus rudicostatus G. B. Sowerby II, 1880; Fusus verrucosus (Gmelin, 1791); Murex verrucosus Gmelin, 1791; Syrinx venosa Röding, 1798

= Marmorofusus verrucosus =

Species of gastropod

Marmorofusus verrucosus is a species of sea snail, a marine gastropod mollusc in the family Fasciolariidae, the spindle snails, the tulip snails and their allies.

Subspecies Fusinus verrucosus var. chuni Martens, 1904 is a synonym of Fusinus chuni (Martens, 1904)

== Description ==
The length of the shell varies between 50 mm and 90 mm.

== Distribution ==
This marine species occurs in the Mediterranean Sea, the Suez Canal, the Western Indian Ocean and the Persian Gulf.
