= Syrinx (disambiguation) =

In Greek mythology, Syrinx was a nymph who was transformed into water reeds that were then fashioned into a musical instrument by the god Pan.

Syrinx may also refer to:

== Music ==
- Syrinx (also known as panpipes or Pan flute), a musical instrument consisting of multiple pipes
  - Simion Stanciu (1949–2010), Romanian pan flautist, stage name "Syrinx"
- Syrinx (Debussy), a piece of music for solo flute
- Syrinx (band), a Canadian electronic music group

== Biology ==
- Syrinx (bird anatomy), the vocal organ of birds
- Syrinx (gastropod), a sea snail genus
- Syrinx (medicine), a fluid-filled cavity in the nervous system
- Caroline reed warbler (Acrocephalus syrinx), a bird

== Other ==
- 3360 Syrinx, an asteroid
- Syringe
