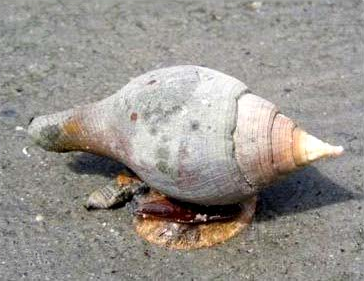
- A live individual of Turbinella laevigata in situ
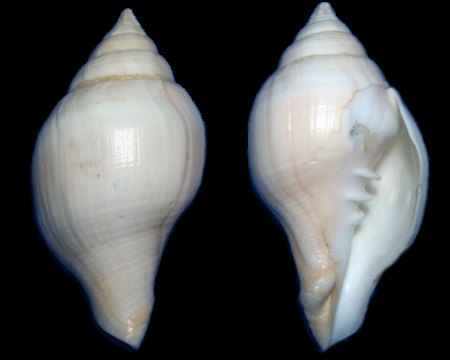
- Two views of a shell of Turbinella laevigata

Scientific classification
- Kingdom: Animalia
- Phylum: Mollusca
- Class: Gastropoda
- Subclass: Caenogastropoda
- Order: Neogastropoda
- Family: Turbinellidae
- Genus: Turbinella
- Species: T. laevigata

Binomial name
- Turbinella laevigata Anton, 1838

Synonyms
- Xancus laevigata (Anton, 1838); Turbinella ovoidea Kiener, 1840; Xancus ovoidea (Kiener, 1840); Turbinella rianae Delsaerdt, 1987

= Turbinella laevigata =

Species of gastropod

Turbinella laevigata, common name the Brazilian chank, is a species of very large sea snail with a gill and an operculum, a marine gastropod mollusk in the subfamily Turbinellinae of the family Turbinellidae.

== Subspecies ==
There are two subspecies of this species:

- Turbinella laevigata laevigata Anton, 1838
- Turbinella laevigata rianae Delsaerdt, 1986 (synonym : Turbinella rianae Delsaerdt, 1987)

== Description ==
The shell of this species is thick and heavy, and can grow as large as 20 centimetres (8 in) in length.

== Distribution ==
This species is found in Brazil.

== Life cycle ==
Turbinella laevigata produces egg capsules which enclose an average of 240 eggs. Approximately ten of these eggs bear young which remain in the capsule for a time after hatching. This is an indication that the remaining 230 eggs are a source of nutrition for these juveniles.

== Human use ==
Turbinella laevigata is used as a zootherapeutical product. It is used as a treatment for sexual impotence in traditional Brazilian medicine in the northeast of Brazil.
