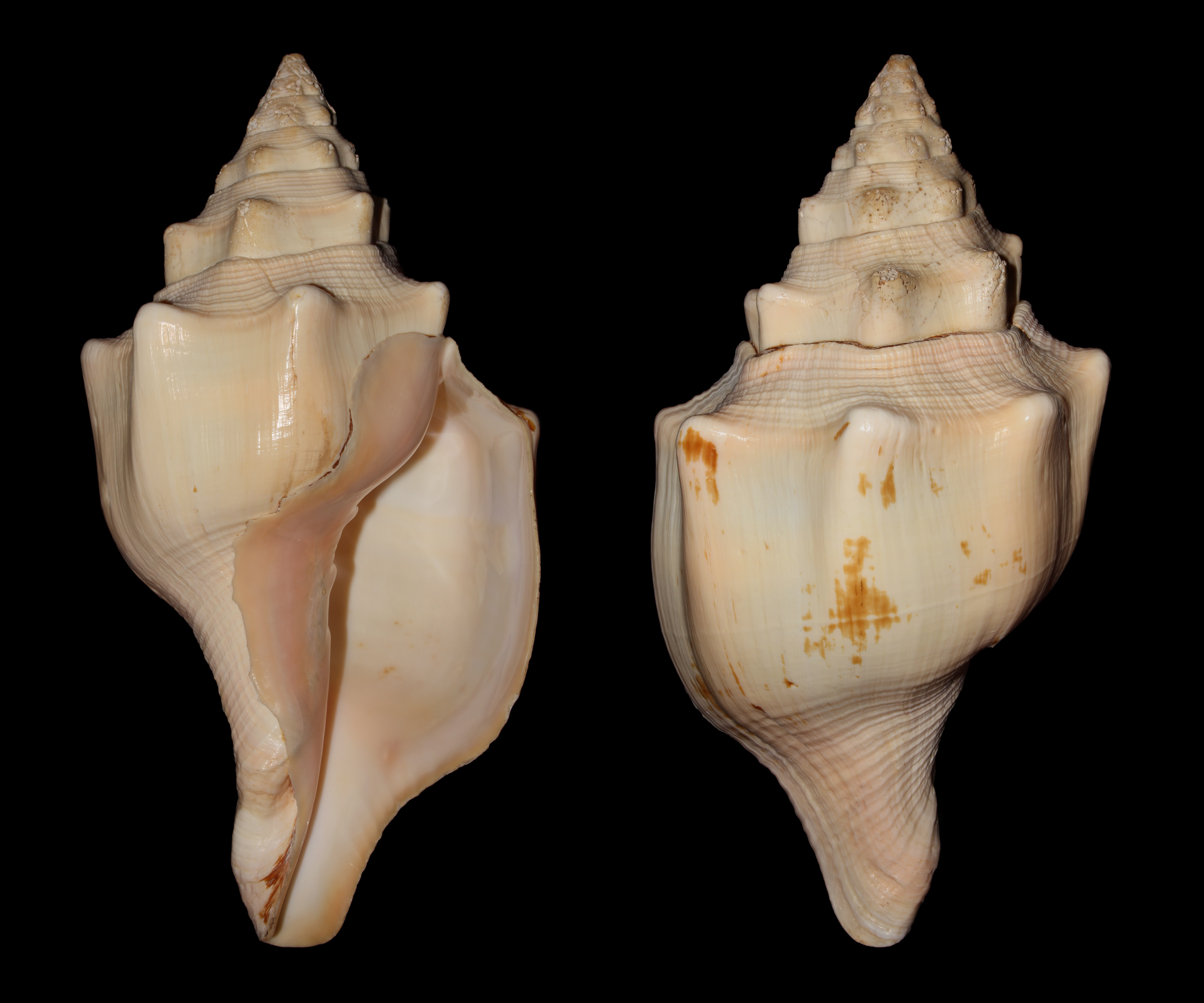
- Two views of a shell of Turbinella angulata.

Scientific classification
- Kingdom: Animalia
- Phylum: Mollusca
- Class: Gastropoda
- Subclass: Caenogastropoda
- Order: Neogastropoda
- Family: Turbinellidae
- Genus: Turbinella
- Species: T. angulata

Binomial name
- Turbinella angulata (Lightfoot, 1786)

= Turbinella angulata =

Species of gastropod

Turbinella angulata, common name the West Indian chank shell or Lamp Shell, is a species of very large tropical sea snail with a gill and an operculum, a marine gastropod mollusk in the family Turbinellidae.

The name "chank" for the shell of this species is derived from the word shankha, the divine conch or sacred conch, Turbinella pyrum, a closely related species from the Indian Ocean. Due to the rarity of the more famous Turbinella pyrum shell, sometimes the Turbinella angulata shell is used as a shankha (ceremonial blowing trumpet).

== Synonyms ==
- Xancus angulata (Lightfoot, 1786)
- Voluta angulata Lightfoot, 1786
- Murex scolymus Gmelin, 1791
- Mazza scolymus (Gmelin, 1791)
- Turbinellus scolymus (Gmelin, 1791)
- Fusus cynara Röding, 1798
- Fasciolaria cardoscolym G. Fischer, 1807
- Tubularia clavata Esper, 1830

== Distribution ==
This species is found in the Western Atlantic Ocean from the Florida Keys and the Bahamas south to Cuba, the Dominican Republic, Jamaica and Haiti, and on the Caribbean coast of Mexico, Belize, Honduras, Nicaragua, Costa Rica, Panama and Colombia.

== Habitat ==
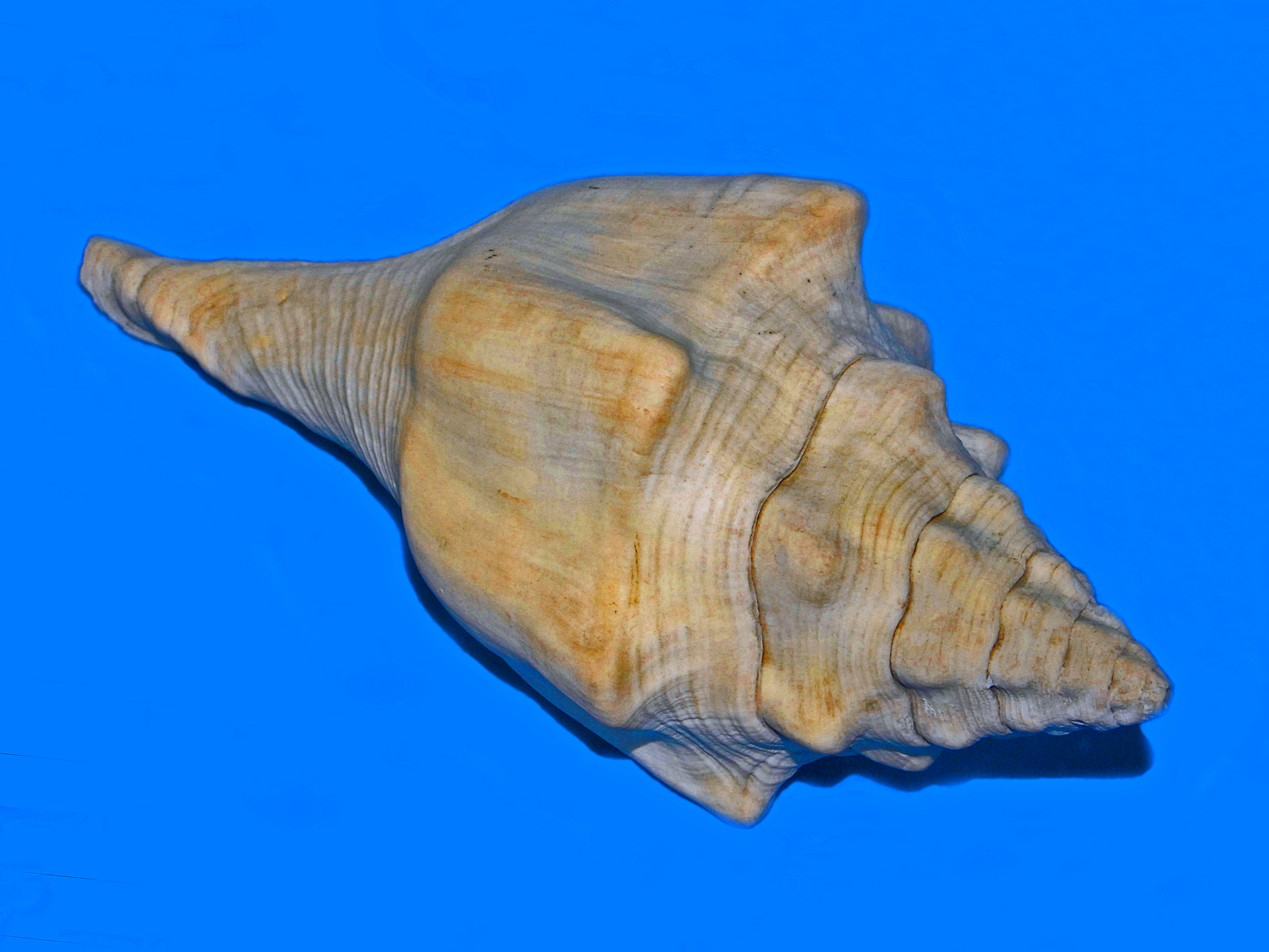
A shell of Turbinella angulata

These large reef-associated gastropods can be found in tropical environment on subtidal and offshore mud, on rock or sand beds, and on mangrove lagoons, at depths of 0 to 45 m.

== Description ==
The shells of Turbinella angulata can reach a size of 12.7–49.6 centimetres (5.0–19.5 in). These large shells are heavy and fusiform, with a sculpture of 8 to 10 prominent ribs angled at shoulder. Columella shows three strong folds. The basic colour of the external shell surface is white, while the inner are may be pink or orange.

== Bibliography ==
- Fischer, G. 1807. Museum Demidoff Museum Demidoff 3 - Université imperiale: Moscou.
- Gmelin, J. F. 1791. Systema naturae per regna tria naturae. Editio decima tertia Systema Naturae, 13th ed., vol. 1 - Lipsiae.
- Lightfoot, J. 1786. - Catalogue of the Portland Museum
- Olsson, A. A. & McGinty, T. L. 1958. Recent marine mollusks from the Caribbean Coast of Panama with the description of some new genera and species. Bulletins of American Paleontology Vol. 39 n. 304
- Röding, P. F. 1798. Museum Boltenianum Hamburg.
- Rosenberg, G.; Moretzsohn, F.; García, E. F. (2009). Gastropoda (Mollusca) of the Gulf of Mexico, Pp. 579–699 in: Felder, D.L. and D.K. Camp (eds.), Gulf of Mexico–Origins, Waters, and Biota. Texas A&M Press, College Station, Texas.
