= Marmorofusus philippii =

Scientific classification
- Kingdom: Animalia
- Phylum: Mollusca
- Class: Gastropoda
- Subclass: Caenogastropoda
- Order: Neogastropoda
- Family: Fasciolariidae
- Genus: Marmorofusus
- Species: M. philippii

Binomial name
- Marmorofusus philippii (Jonas, 1846)

Synonyms
- Fusinus dampieri Finlay, 1930; Fusinus tessellatus (G. B. Sowerby II, 1880); Fusus exilis Menke, 1843 (uncertain synonym; invalid: junior homonym of Fusus exilis Conrad, 1832; Fusinus dampieri is a replacement name); Fusus philippii Jonas, 1846 (original combination); Fusus tessellatus G. B. Sowerby II, 1880 (invalid: junior homonym of Fusus tessellatus Schubert & Wagner, 1829)

Species of gastropod

Marmorofusus philippii is a species of sea snail, a marine gastropod mollusc in the family Fasciolariidae, the spindle snails, the tulip snails and their allies.

== Distribution ==
This marine species occurs off Western Australia
