= Cryptofusus cryptocarinatus =

Scientific classification
- Kingdom: Animalia
- Phylum: Mollusca
- Class: Gastropoda
- Subclass: Caenogastropoda
- Order: Neogastropoda
- Family: Turbinellidae
- Genus: Cryptofusus
- Species: C. cryptocarinatus

Binomial name
- Cryptofusus cryptocarinatus ( Dell, 1956)

Synonyms
- Pleia cryptocarinata Dell, 1956; Pleuroploca (Pleia) cryptocarinata Dell, 1956

Species of gastropod

Cryptofusus cryptocarinatus is a species of sea snail, a marine gastropod mollusk in the family Fasciolariidae, the spindle snails, the tulip snails and their allies.

== Distribution ==
This marine species can be found along New Zealand.
