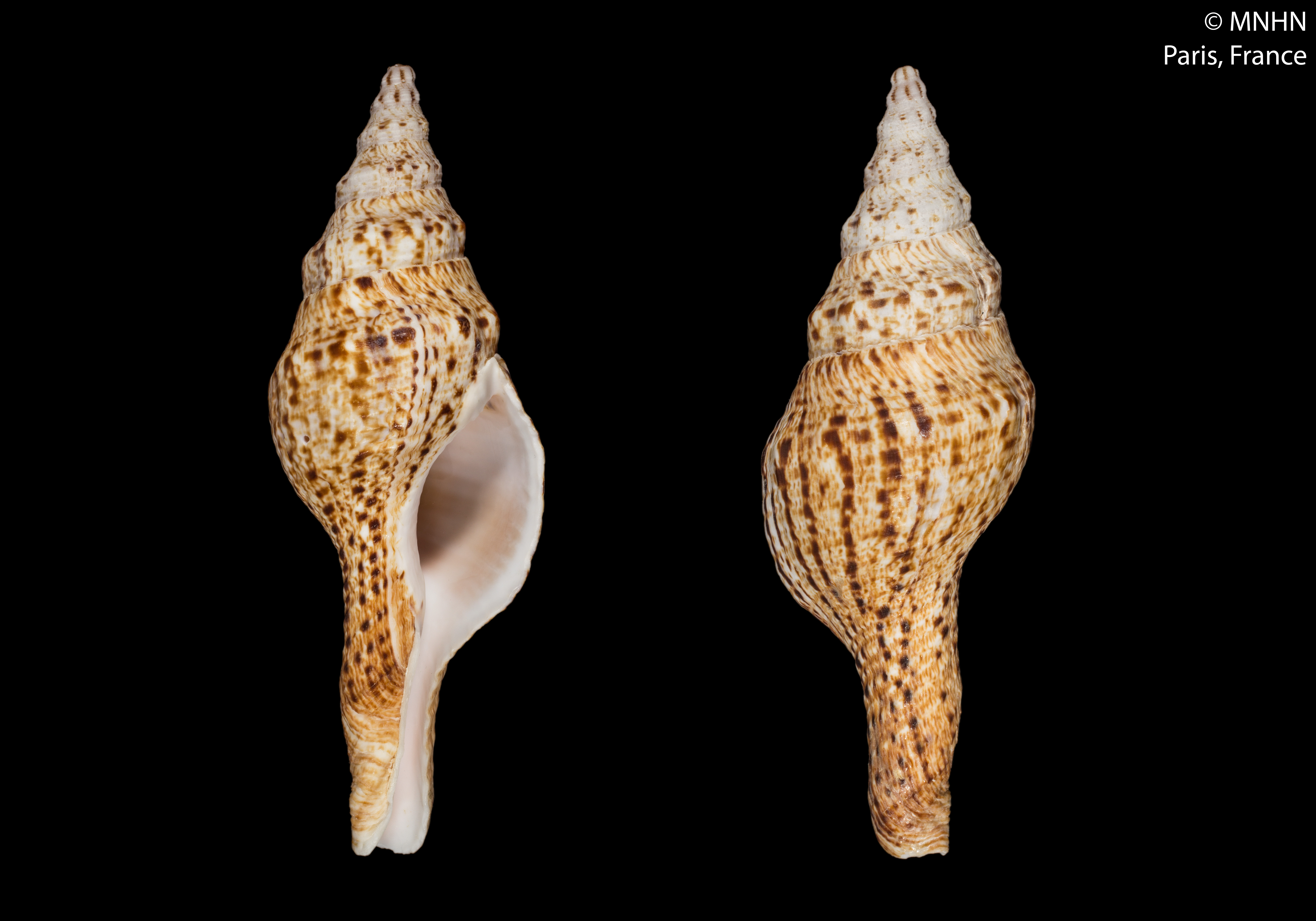
- Shell of Marmorofusus brianoi (holotype at MNHN, Paris)

Scientific classification
- Kingdom: Animalia
- Phylum: Mollusca
- Class: Gastropoda
- Subclass: Caenogastropoda
- Order: Neogastropoda
- Family: Fasciolariidae
- Genus: Marmorofusus
- Species: M. brianoi

Binomial name
- Marmorofusus brianoi (Bozzetti, 2006)

Synonyms
- Fusinus brianoi Bozzetti, 2006 (priginal combination)

= Marmorofusus brianoi =

Species of gastropod

Marmorofusus brianoi, previously named Fusinus brianoi(2006), is a species of sea snail, a marine gastropod mollusc in the family Fasciolariidae, the spindle snails, the tulip snails and their allies.

== Description ==
The seashell of Marmorofusus brianoi is medium to large size considering its genus, between 122 mm and 170 mm. It is fusiform, broad and massive. Its external colours are composed of a white background with a spiral pattern of brown spots and dashes while the inside is white. The shell's periostracum is thin and brown. The operculum of Marmorofusus brianoi is also brown coloured.

== Distribution ==
This marine species occurs off of the coasts of Madagascar. From the areas of Lavanono to Manantenina.
