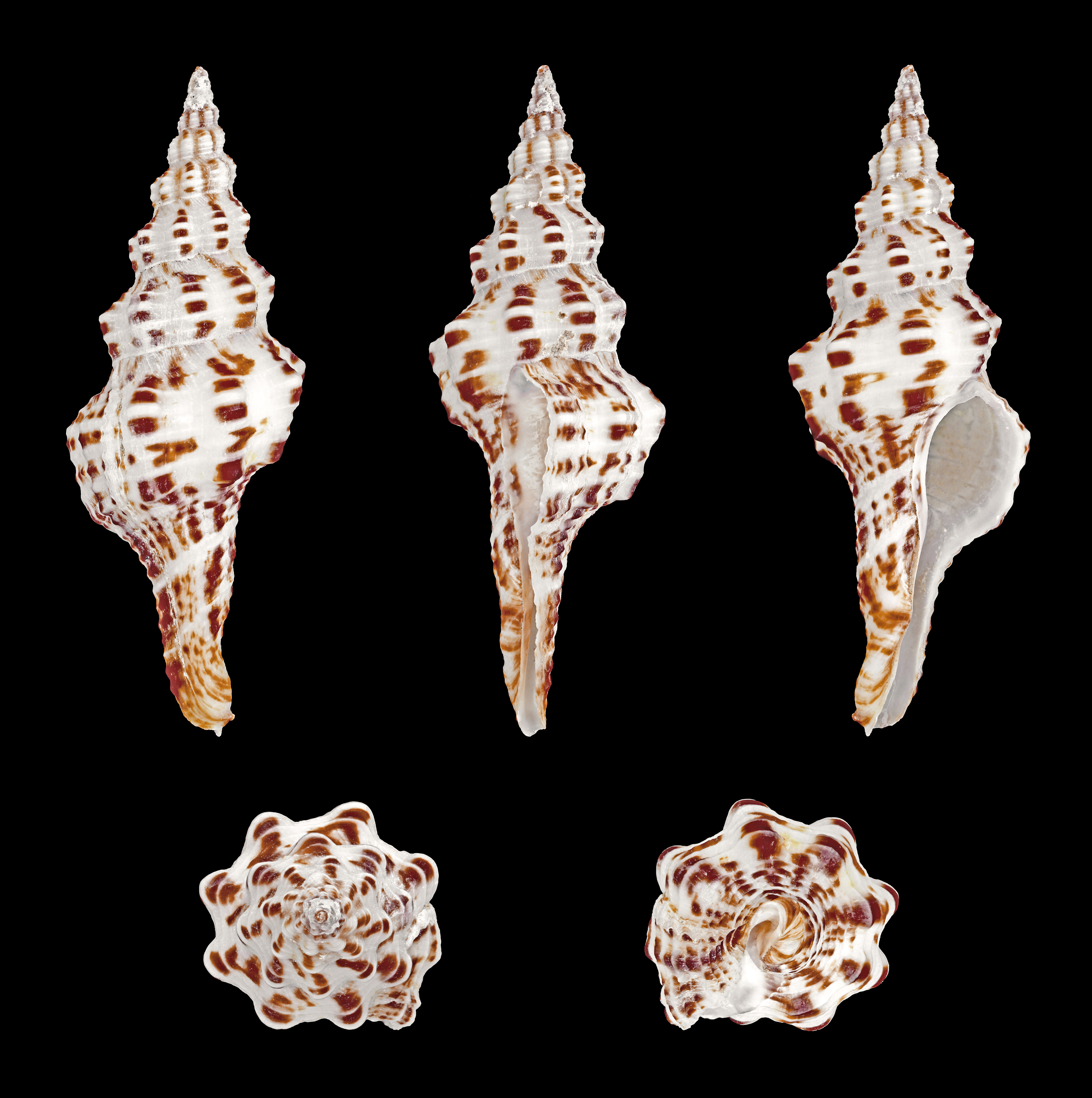
- Shell of Marmorofusus polygonoides

Scientific classification
- Kingdom: Animalia
- Phylum: Mollusca
- Class: Gastropoda
- Subclass: Caenogastropoda
- Order: Neogastropoda
- Family: Fasciolariidae
- Genus: Marmorofusus
- Species: M. polygonoides

Binomial name
- Marmorofusus polygonoides (Lamarck, 1822)

Synonyms
- Fusinus polygonoides (Lamarck, 1822); Fusus biangulatus Deshayes, 1833; Fusus polygonoides Lamarck, 1822

= Marmorofusus polygonoides =

Species of gastropod

Marmorofusus polygonoides is a species of sea snail, a marine gastropod mollusc in the family Fasciolariidae, the spindle snails, the tulip snails and their allies.

== Distribution ==
This marine species occurs in the southern Gulf of Suez, Gulf of Aqaba, and north-central Red Sea
