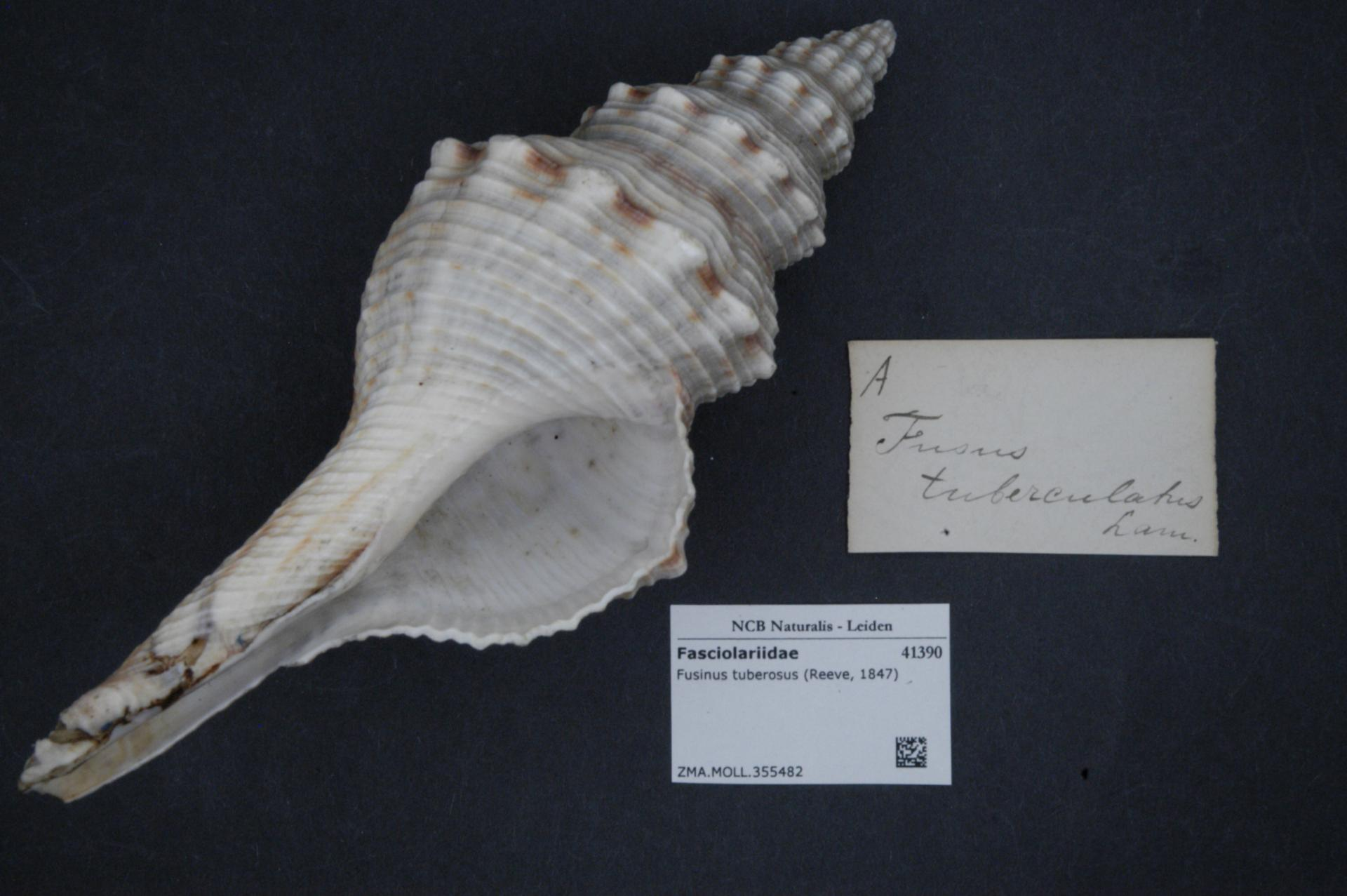
- Marmorofusus tuberosus

Scientific classification
- Kingdom: Animalia
- Phylum: Mollusca
- Class: Gastropoda
- Subclass: Caenogastropoda
- Order: Neogastropoda
- Family: Fasciolariidae
- Genus: Marmorofusus
- Species: M. tuberosus

Binomial name
- Marmorofusus tuberosus (Reeve, 1847)

Synonyms
- Fusinus tuberosus (Reeve, 1847); Fusus tuberosus Reeve, 1847

= Marmorofusus tuberosus =

Species of gastropod

Marmorofusus tuberosus is a species of sea snail, a marine gastropod mollusc in the family Fasciolariidae, the spindle snails, the tulip snails and their allies.

== Distribution ==
This marine species occurs off Okinawa Island.
