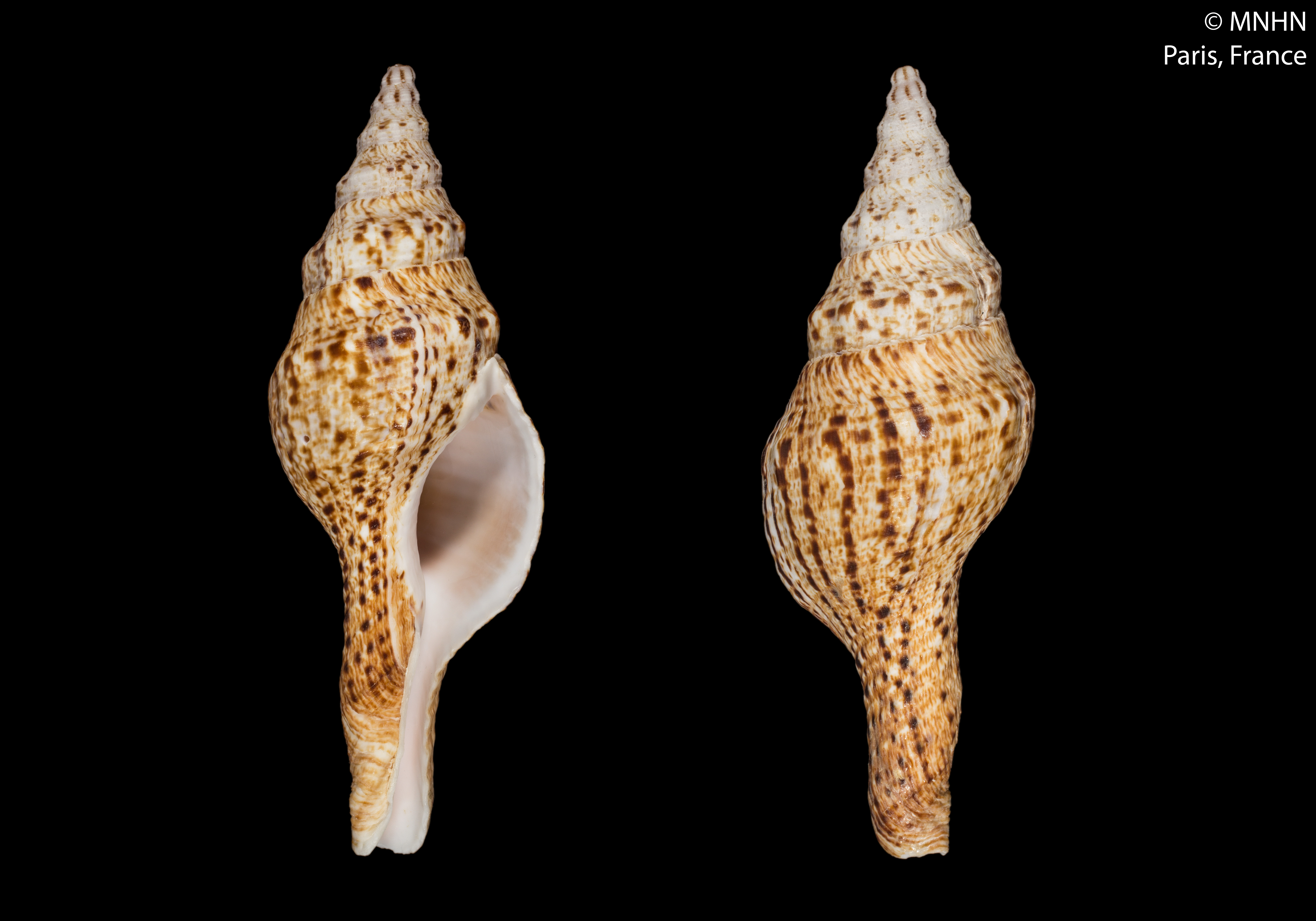
- Shell of Marmorofusus brianoi

Scientific classification
- Kingdom: Animalia
- Phylum: Mollusca
- Class: Gastropoda
- Subclass: Caenogastropoda
- Order: Neogastropoda
- Superfamily: Buccinoidea
- Family: Fasciolariidae
- Genus: Marmorofusus; Snyder & Lyons, 2014

Type species
- Syrinx nicobarica Röding, 1798

= Marmorofusus =

Genus of gastropods

Marmorofusus is a genus of sea snails, marine gastropod molluscs in the subfamily Fusininae of the family Fasciolariidae, the spindle snails and tulip snails.

== Species ==
- Marmorofusus akitai (Kuroda & Habe, 1961)
- Marmorofusus bishopi (Petuch & Berschauer, 2017)
- Marmorofusus brianoi (Bozzetti, 2006)
- Marmorofusus hedleyi Snyder & Lyons, 2014
- † Marmorofusus idjowensis (Oostingh, 1939)
- Marmorofusus leptorhynchus (Tapperoni Canefri, 1875)
- Marmorofusus matteus Snyder & Lyons, 2014
- Marmorofusus michaelrogersi (Goodwin, 2001)
- Marmorofusus natalensis Snyder & Lyons, 2014
- Marmorofusus nicobaricus (Röding, 1798)
- Marmorofusus nigrirostratus (E. A. Smith, 1879)
- Marmorofusus oblitus (Reeve, 1847)
- Marmorofusus philippii (Jonas, 1846)
- Marmorofusus polygonoides (Lamarck, 1822)
- Marmorofusus tuberculatus (Lamarck, 1822)
- Marmorofusus tuberosus (Reeve, 1847)
- Marmorofusus undulatus (Gmelin, 1791)
- Marmorofusus verbinneni (Snyder, 2006)
- Marmorofusus vercoi (Snyder, 2004)
- Marmorofusus verrucosus (Gmelin, 1791)
- Marmorofusus wellsi (Snyder, 2004)

Species brought into synonymy

- Marmorofusus brenchleyi (Baird, 1873): synonym of Marmorofusus nicobaricus (Röding, 1798)
