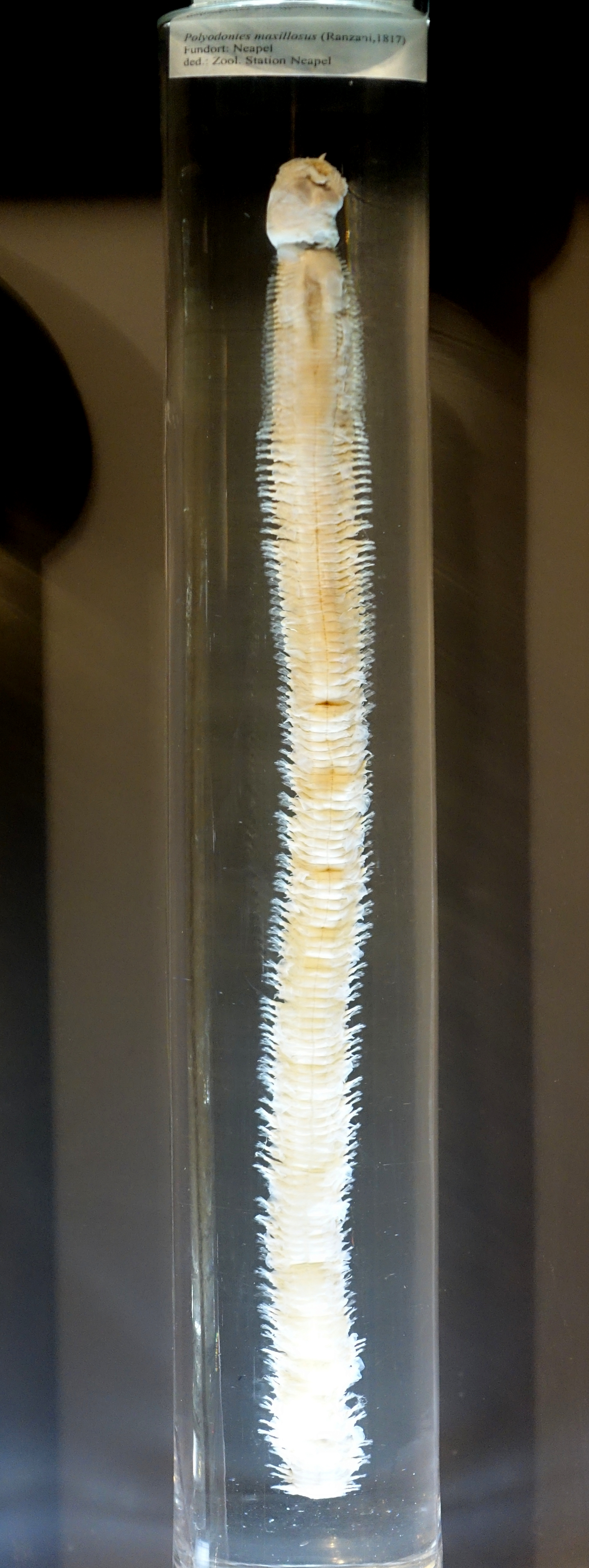

Scientific classification
- Kingdom: Animalia
- Phylum: Annelida
- Clade: Pleistoannelida
- Subclass: Errantia
- Order: Phyllodocida
- Family: Acoetidae
- Genus: Polyodontes
- Species: P. maxillosus

Binomial name
- Polyodontes maxillosus (Ranzani, 1817)

= Polyodontes maxillosus =

Species of annelid worm

Polyodontes maxillosus is a species of polychaete worm in the family Acoetidae.
