= Marmorofusus verbinneni =

Scientific classification
- Kingdom: Animalia
- Phylum: Mollusca
- Class: Gastropoda
- Subclass: Caenogastropoda
- Order: Neogastropoda
- Family: Fasciolariidae
- Genus: Marmorofusus
- Species: M. verbinneni

Binomial name
- Marmorofusus verbinneni (Snyder, 2006)

Synonyms
- Fusinus verbinneni Snyder, 2006 (original combination)

Species of gastropod

Marmorofusus verbinneni is a species of sea snail, a marine gastropod mollusc in the family Fasciolariidae, the spindle snails, the tulip snails and their allies.

== Distribution ==
This marine species occurs in the northern Red Sea; Gulf of Aqaba and Egyptian coast from near Hurghada southward to Al Quşayr, 2–20 m.
