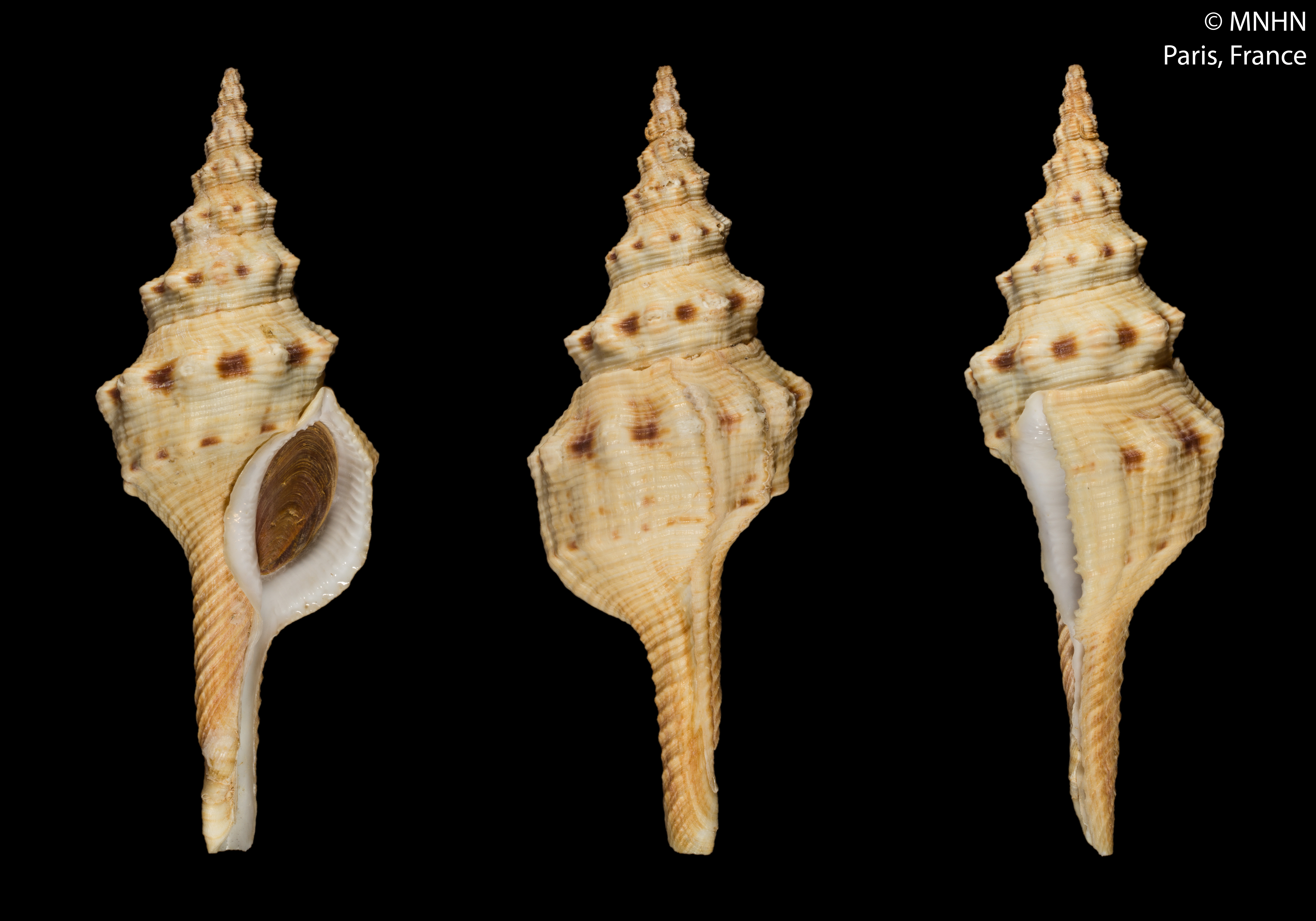
- Shell of Marmorofusus tuberculatus (specimen at MNHN, Paris)

Scientific classification
- Kingdom: Animalia
- Phylum: Mollusca
- Class: Gastropoda
- Subclass: Caenogastropoda
- Order: Neogastropoda
- Superfamily: Buccinoidea
- Family: Fasciolariidae
- Genus: Marmorofusus
- Species: M. tuberculatus

Binomial name
- Marmorofusus tuberculatus (Lamarck, 1822)

Synonyms
- Fusinus indicus (Anton, 1838); Fusinus tuberculatus (Lamarck, 1822); Fusinus tuberculatus fuscobandatus Bozzetti, 2017; Fusinus tuberculatus priscai Bozzetti, 2013; Fusinus tuberculatus tuberculatus (Lamarck, 1822); Fusus indicus Anton, 1838; Fusus maculiferus Tapparone Canefri, 1875; Fusus tuberculatus Lamarck, 1822 (original combination)

= Marmorofusus tuberculatus =

Species of gastropod

Marmorofusus tuberculatus is a species of sea snail, a marine gastropod mollusc in the family Fasciolariidae, the spindle snails, the tulip snails and their allies.

== Distribution ==
This marine species occurs off East Africa and western Indian Ocean, including Somalia, Kenya, Tanzania, Mozambique, South Africa, Madagascar, Seychelles, Mauritius, La Réunion and Saya de Malha Bank.
