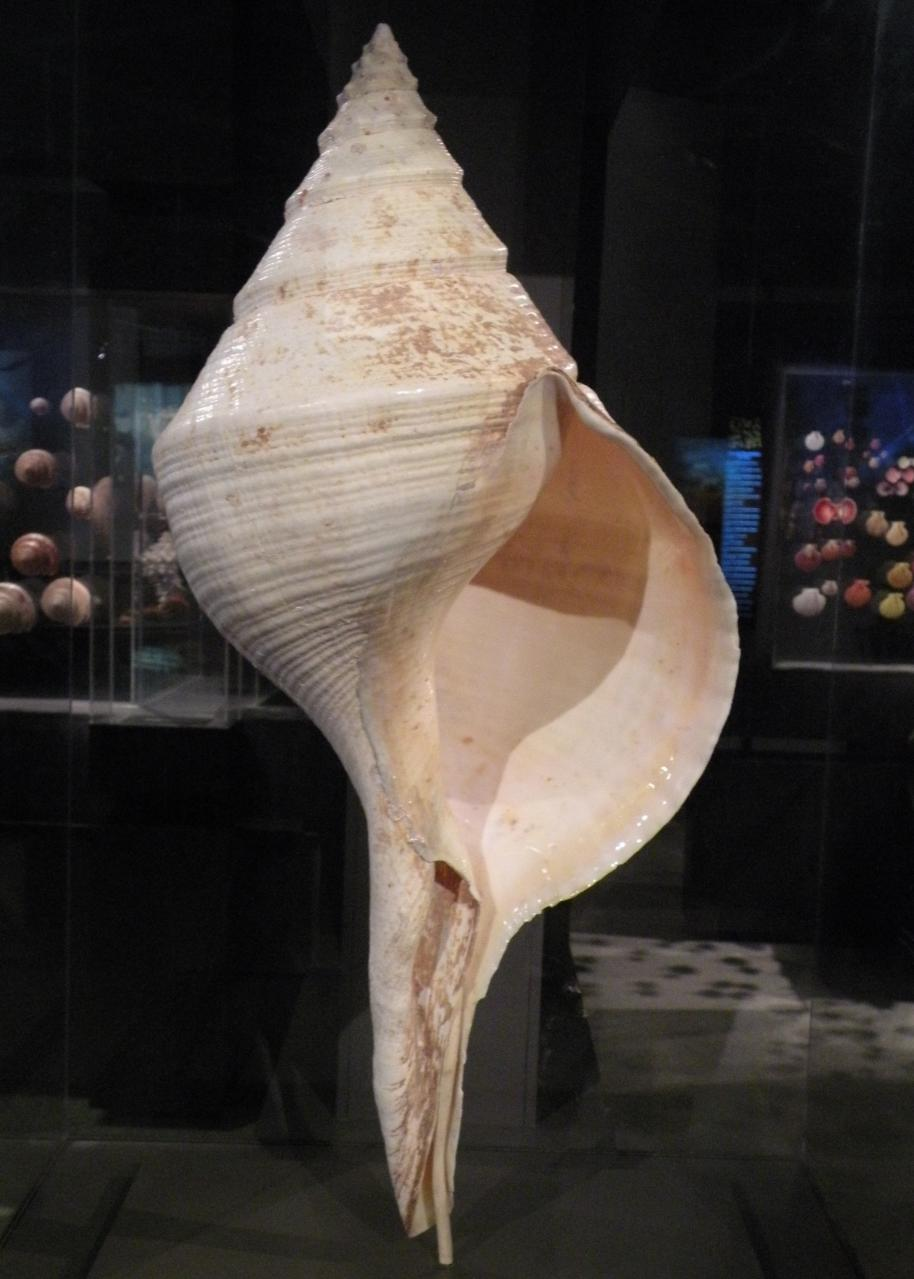
- shell of Syrinx aruanus

Scientific classification
- Kingdom: Animalia
- Phylum: Mollusca
- Class: Gastropoda
- Subclass: Caenogastropoda
- Order: Neogastropoda
- Family: Turbinellidae
- Genus: Syrinx; Röding, 1798
- Species: S. aruanus

Binomial name
- Syrinx aruanus (Linnaeus, 1758)

Synonyms
- A synonym for the genus Syrinx: Megalatractus; Murex aruanus Linnaeus, 1758; Megalatractus aruanus (Linnaeus, 1758); Murex gigas Born, 1780; Fusus proboscidiferus Lamarck, 1822; Cerithium brazieri Tryon, 1887

= Syrinx aruanus =

Species of gastropod

Syrinx aruanus, common name the Australian trumpet or false trumpet, is a species of extremely large sea snail measuring up to 75 cm long and weighing up to 18 kg. It is a marine gastropod mollusk in the family Turbinellidae, and is the only species in the genus Syrinx.

This is the largest extant snail (shelled gastropod) species in the world, and arguably the largest (heaviest) gastropod in the world. Although the shell itself is quite well known to shell collectors because of its extraordinary size, little is known about the ecology and behavior of the species, except for one study about its feeding habits.

== Taxonomy ==
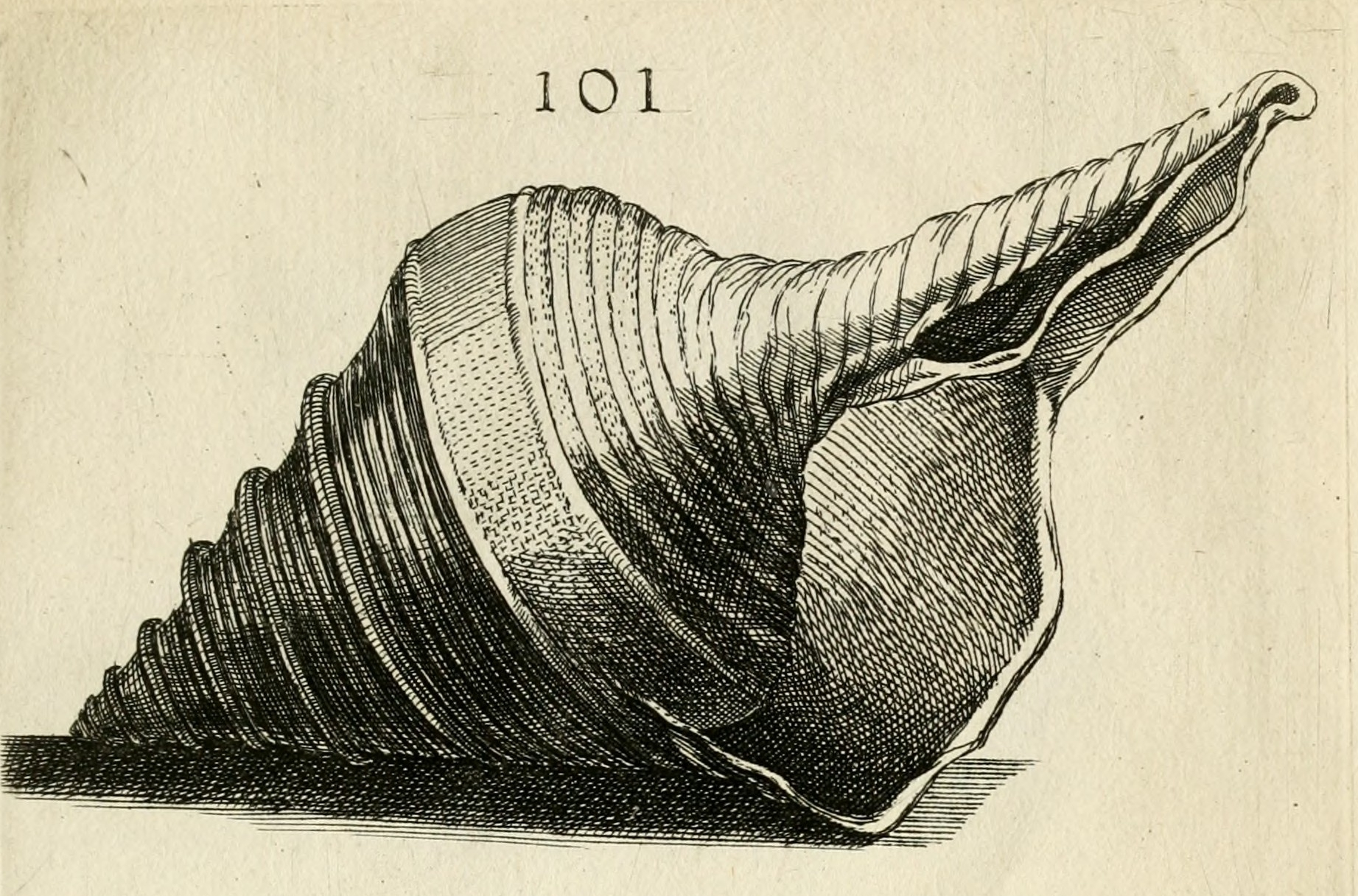
1681 engraving of a shell of Syrinx aruanus by Filippo Bonanni. Here the coiling of the shell appears to be reversed, this is due to the engraving process.

In 1681, Filippo Bonanni depicted this species in one of the first books ever published that was solely about seashells. The book was entitled: "Ricreatione dell' occhio e dela mente nell oservation' delle Chiociolle, proposta a' curiosi delle opere della natura, &c."

The taxonomic affinities of Syrinx aruanus were not properly understood for a long time. Until fairly recently it was placed in the family Melongenidae. A detailed taxonomic overview of this species was provided by Harasewych & Petit (1989).

== Description ==
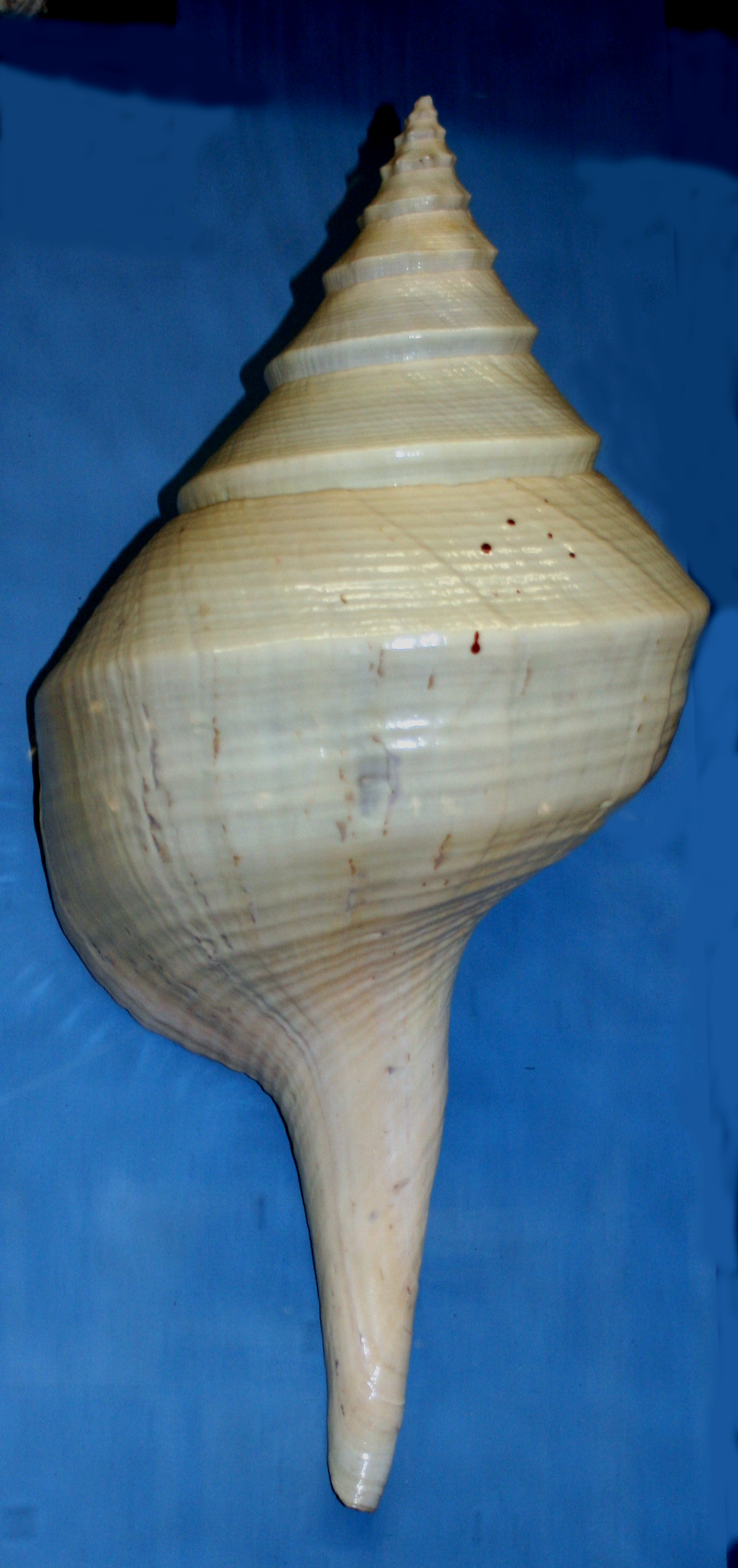
Dorsal view of a shell

This is the largest recent (as opposed to fossil) shelled gastropod, and the largest shelled gastropod by weight. (However, the largest shell-less gastropod or slug is Aplysia vaccaria, a giant sea hare known as the California black sea hare. The largest A. vaccaria has been measured at 99 cm in length and weighing in at almost 14 kg). An extremely large species of fossil gastropod is Campanile giganteum.

The overall height (also known as length) of the shell of S. aruanus is up to 72 cm.

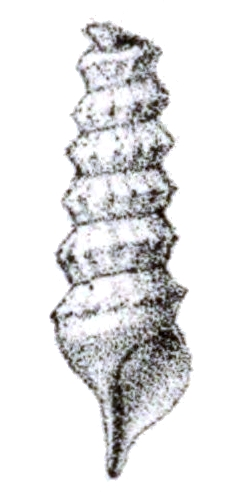
Drawing of the protoconch, from Tryon, 1887

The maximum known size of the shell has been widely reported as 91 cm, however, this has been corrected in a number of publications including the article "Sizing ocean giants: patterns of intraspecific size variation in marine megafauna" where the authors reported the following: "Taylor & Glover (2003) reported that largest specimen was 91 cm in length and referenced a 1982 issue of Hawaiian Shell News (Issue 7, pg. 12). A photograph shows club member Don Pisor and children holding the specimen, with the caption stating the specimen was 36 inches (91.4 cm). However, the record holder for the largest S. aruanus ascribed by the Registry of World Record Size Shells places the maximum length at 72.2 cm. This specimen is also attributed to Don Pisor and was recorded in 1979. We have learned that these specimens are the same individual and the correct measurement is 72.2 cm (D Pisor, pers. obs., 2014)". It is also of some note that this exact same specimen has been listed as 72.2 cm (Wagner and Abbott's World Size Records, 1990 edition), 772mm (Registry of World Record Size Shells) and 76.2 cm (signage by the actual record shell on display in the Houston Museum of Natural Science). The shell is usually pale apricot in color, however in life it is covered by thick brown or grey periostracum. The shell color can fade to a creamy yellow. The whole shell has a spindle-like shape. The spire of the shell is high. The whorls usually have a strong keel which can have nodules on it. The shell has a long siphonal canal. There are no folds on the columella, unlike some other genera within the same family.

Juvenile shells show a long tower-shaped protoconch or embryonic shell of 5 whorls, which is usually lost in the adult. This protoconch is about 2.5 cm long and looks so unlike the adult shell that it was described by George Washington Tryon in 1887 as a different species.

The weight of the animal (including the shell) can be up to 18 kg (40 lb). The radula of this species was described in detail by Wells et al. (2003).

== Distribution ==
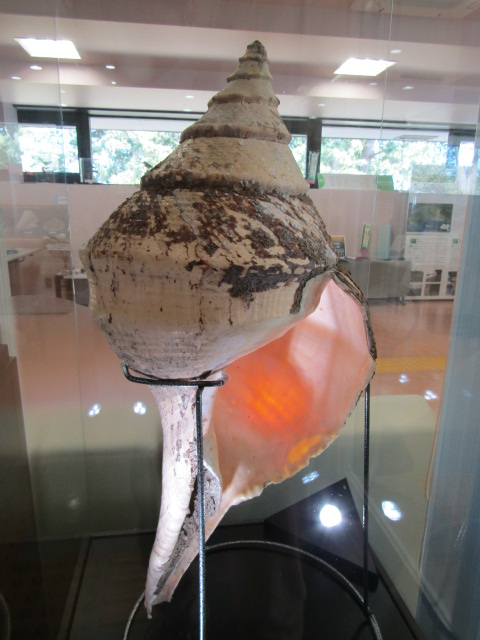
In Endo Shell Museum

This species occurs in the northern half of Australia and adjacent areas, including eastern Indonesia and Papua New Guinea.

== Ecology ==
These giant snails live on sandy bottoms in the intertidal zone and the sublittoral down to about 30 m. Where it has not been overfished, this snail is locally common. (Abbott & Dance, 1982)

This carnivorous species is specialized for feeding on polychaete worms in the genera Polyodontes (Acoetidae), Loimia (Terebellidae) and Diopatra (Onuphidae). It may seem unlikely for such a large gastropod to feed on worms, but worms in the family Acoetidae do include the largest polychaetes, with a length of over 1 meter. These worms live in tubes; Syrinx aruanus can reach them with its proboscis, which has a length of up to 250 mm.

== Human uses ==
This species is fished both for its very large shell and for its edible flesh, which is sometimes used as bait. The shell is sold for shell collections and is used as a source of lime. Another use of its shell is as a water carrier.

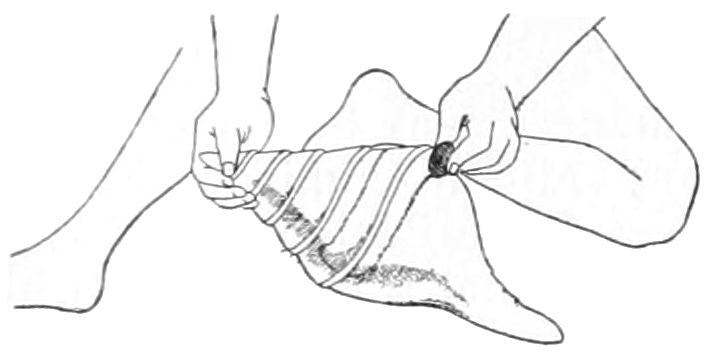
Drawing of creating a nose-pin from the shell of Syrinx aruanus.

The Aboriginal Australian peoples who live on the Pennefather River in Queensland, use (or used) a half-moon shaped nose-pin known as an imina which is made from the shell of Syrinx aruanus. This nose pin is employed by men only; the women use a piece of grass instead. In order to make one of these nose pins, if the Syrinx shell is fresh, then it can be worked on right away, but if it is dried out, the shell is first soaked for two or three days in water. After this, a portion of the shell which is near the suture and the keel on the body whorl is chipped out using a stone, (see image), and then is ground down with water. The resulting rib-shaped object is used as the nose-pin.

== See also ==
- Triplofusus papillosus, the largest living sea snail species in the Americas
