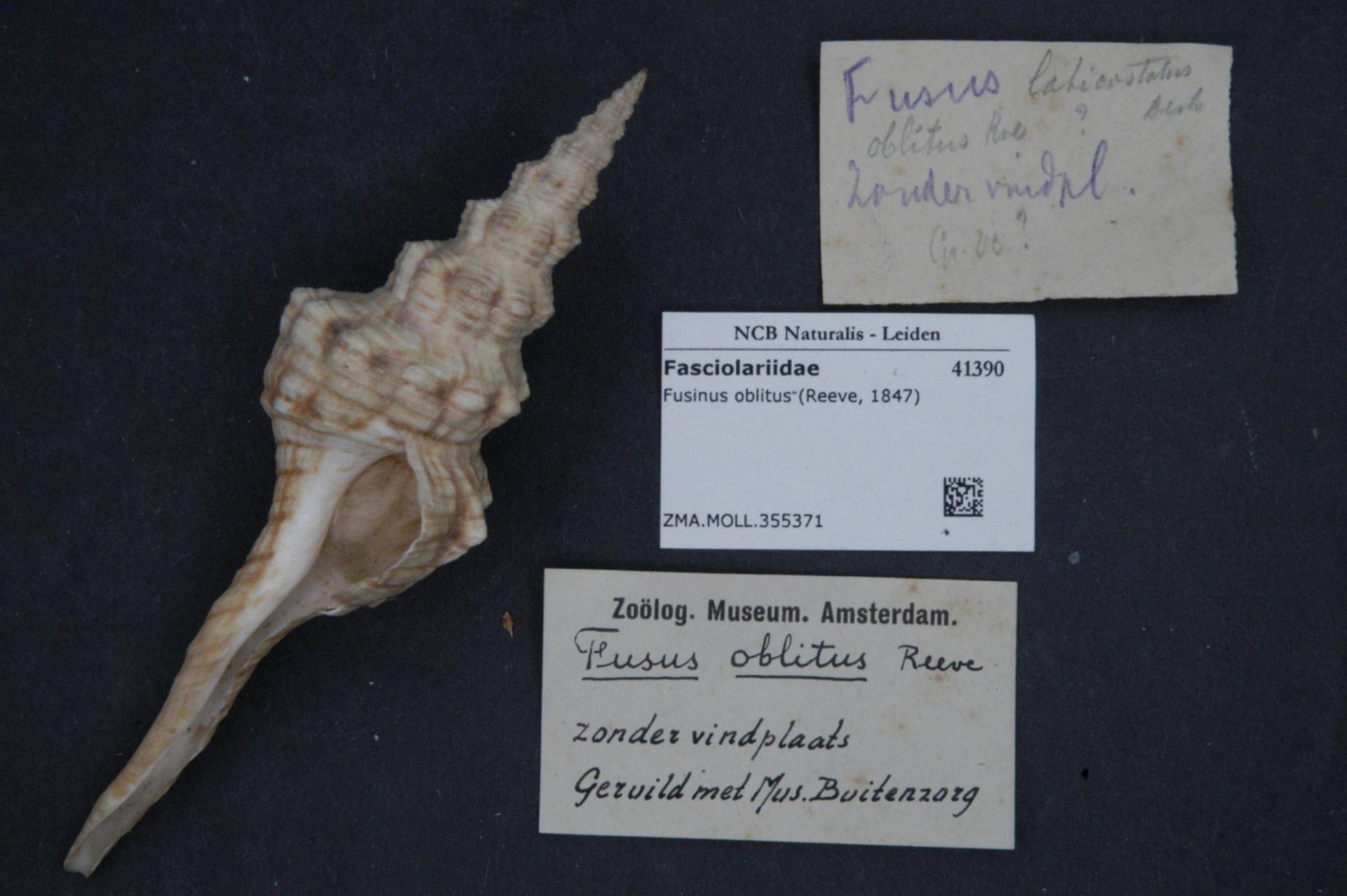

Scientific classification
- Kingdom: Animalia
- Phylum: Mollusca
- Class: Gastropoda
- Subclass: Caenogastropoda
- Order: Neogastropoda
- Family: Fasciolariidae
- Genus: Marmorofusus
- Species: M. oblitus

Binomial name
- Marmorofusus oblitus (Reeve, 1847)

Synonyms
- Fusinus oblitus (Reeve, 1847); Fusinus turrispictus Hedley, 1918; Fusus oblitus Reeve, 1847

= Marmorofusus oblitus =

Species of gastropod

Marmorofusus oblitus is a species of sea snail, a marine gastropod mollusc in the family Fasciolariidae, the spindle snails, the tulip snails and their allies.

== Distribution ==
This marine species occurs off La Réunion and Mauritius, Mascarene Islands; Mozambique and northern South Africa?
