= Marmorofusus leptorhynchus =

Scientific classification
- Kingdom: Animalia
- Phylum: Mollusca
- Class: Gastropoda
- Subclass: Caenogastropoda
- Order: Neogastropoda
- Family: Fasciolariidae
- Genus: Marmorofusus
- Species: M. leptorhynchus

Binomial name
- Marmorofusus leptorhynchus (Tapparone-Canefri, 1875)

Synonyms
- Fusinus leptorhynchus (Tapparone Canefri, 1875); Fusus leptorhynchus Tapparone-Canefri, 1875; Fusus subquadratus G. B. Sowerby II, 1880

Species of gastropod

Marmorofusus leptorhynchus is a species of sea snail, a marine gastropod mollusc in the family Fasciolariidae, the spindle snails, the tulip snails and their allies.

== Distribution ==
This marine species occurs in the Red Sea: Egypt, Sinai, Gulf of Aqaba, Jordan, western Saudi Arabia south to Sudan and Eritrea.
