= Cryptofusus =

Scientific classification
- Kingdom: Animalia
- Phylum: Mollusca
- Class: Gastropoda
- Subclass: Caenogastropoda
- Order: Neogastropoda
- Family: Turbinellidae
- Subfamily: Turbinellinae
- Genus: Cryptofusus; Beu, 2011

Type species
- Pleia cryptocarinata Dell, 1956

Synonyms
- Pleia Finlay, 1930

Genus of gastropods

Cryptofusus is a monospecific genus of large sea snails with a gill and an operculum, marine gastropod mollusks in the family Turbinellidae.

== Distribution ==
This marine species can be found along New Zealand

== Species ==
- Cryptofusus cryptocarinatus (Dell, 1956)
- † Cryptofusus otaioensis (H. J. Finlay, 1930)
