= Marmorofusus vercoi =

Scientific classification
- Kingdom: Animalia
- Phylum: Mollusca
- Class: Gastropoda
- Subclass: Caenogastropoda
- Order: Neogastropoda
- Family: Fasciolariidae
- Genus: Marmorofusus
- Species: M. vercoi

Binomial name
- Marmorofusus vercoi (Snyder, 2004)

Synonyms
- Fusinus vercoi Snyder, 2004 (original combination)

Species of gastropod

Marmorofusus vercoi is a species of sea snail, a marine gastropod mollusc in the family Fasciolariidae, the spindle snails, the tulip snails and their allies.

== Distribution ==
This marine species is endemic to Australia and occurs off Western Australia, from vicinity of Albany to Fremantle, 10–45 m
