= Marmorofusus michaelrogersi =

Scientific classification
- Kingdom: Animalia
- Phylum: Mollusca
- Class: Gastropoda
- Subclass: Caenogastropoda
- Order: Neogastropoda
- Family: Fasciolariidae
- Genus: Marmorofusus
- Species: M. michaelrogersi

Binomial name
- Marmorofusus michaelrogersi (Goodwin, 2001)

Synonyms
- Fusinus michaelrogersi Goodwin, 2001 (original combination)

Species of gastropod

Marmorofusus michaelrogersi is a species of sea snail, a marine gastropod mollusk in the family Fasciolariidae, the spindle snails, the tulip snails and their allies.

== Distribution ==
Marmorofusus michaelrogersi can be found in Pacific waters, ranging from Hawaii to Midway Island.
