= Marmorofusus akitai =

Scientific classification
- Kingdom: Animalia
- Phylum: Mollusca
- Class: Gastropoda
- Subclass: Caenogastropoda
- Order: Neogastropoda
- Family: Fasciolariidae
- Genus: Marmorofusus
- Species: M. akitai

Binomial name
- Marmorofusus akitai (Kuroda & Habe, 1961)

Synonyms
- Fusinus akitai Kuroda & Habe, 1961 (original combination)

Species of gastropod

Marmorofusus akitai is a species of sea snail, a marine gastropod mollusc in the family Fasciolariidae, the spindle snails, the tulip snails and their allies.

== Distribution ==
This marine species occurs off Japan.
