= Marmorofusus wellsi =

Scientific classification
- Kingdom: Animalia
- Phylum: Mollusca
- Class: Gastropoda
- Subclass: Caenogastropoda
- Order: Neogastropoda
- Family: Fasciolariidae
- Genus: Marmorofusus
- Species: M. wellsi

Binomial name
- Marmorofusus wellsi (Snyder, 2004)

Synonyms
- Fusinus wellsi Snyder, 2004 (original combination)

Species of gastropod

Marmorofusus wellsi is a species of sea snail, a marine gastropod mollusk in the family Fasciolariidae, the spindle snails, the tulip snails and their allies.

== Distribution ==
This marine species is endemic to Australia and occurs off Western Australia, from NW of Bluff Point near Geraldton to Cape Naturaliste and to Albany; 20–221 m; Margaret River to Esperance, 30–100 m
