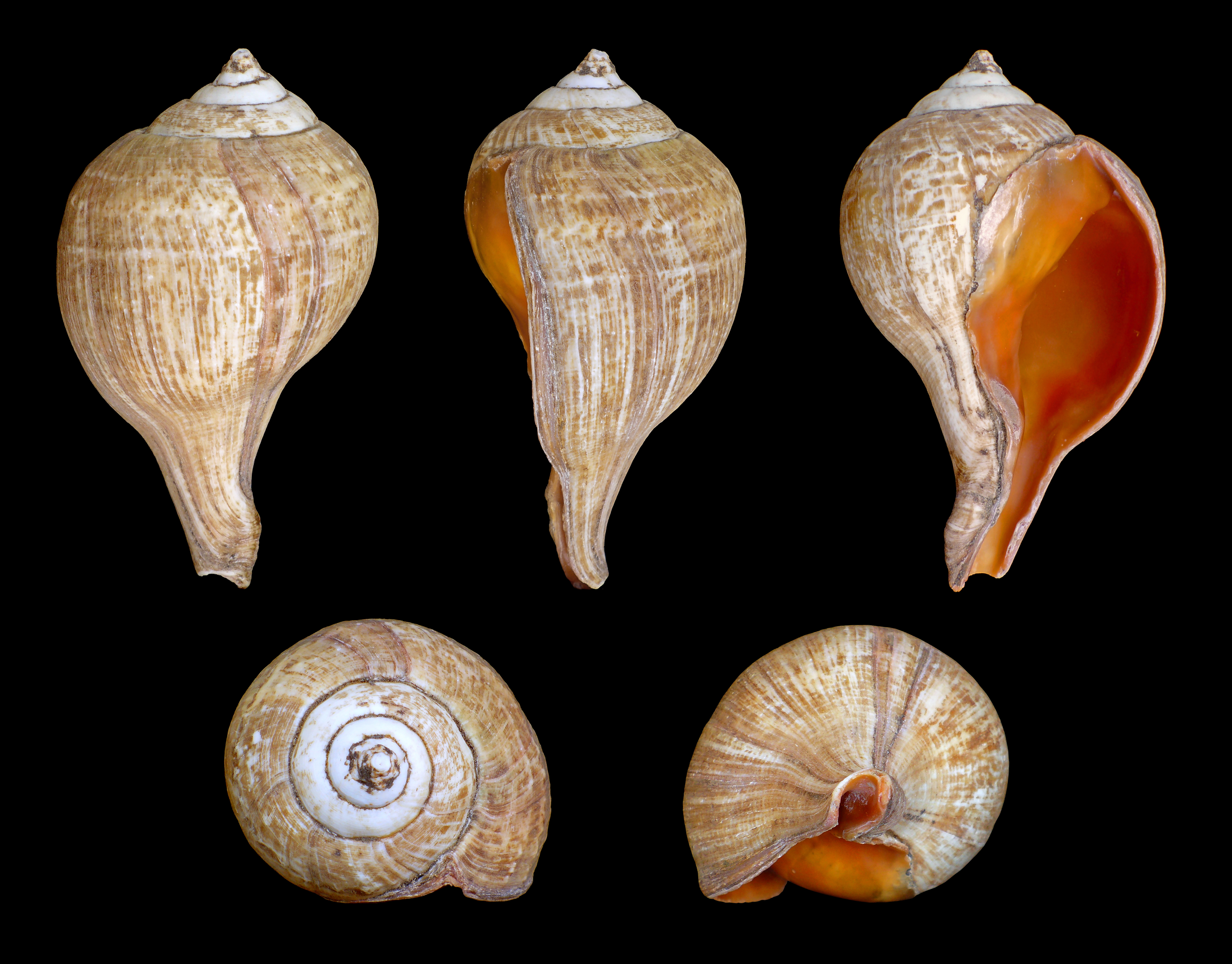
- Five views of a shell ofTurbinella pyrum with its periostracum intact
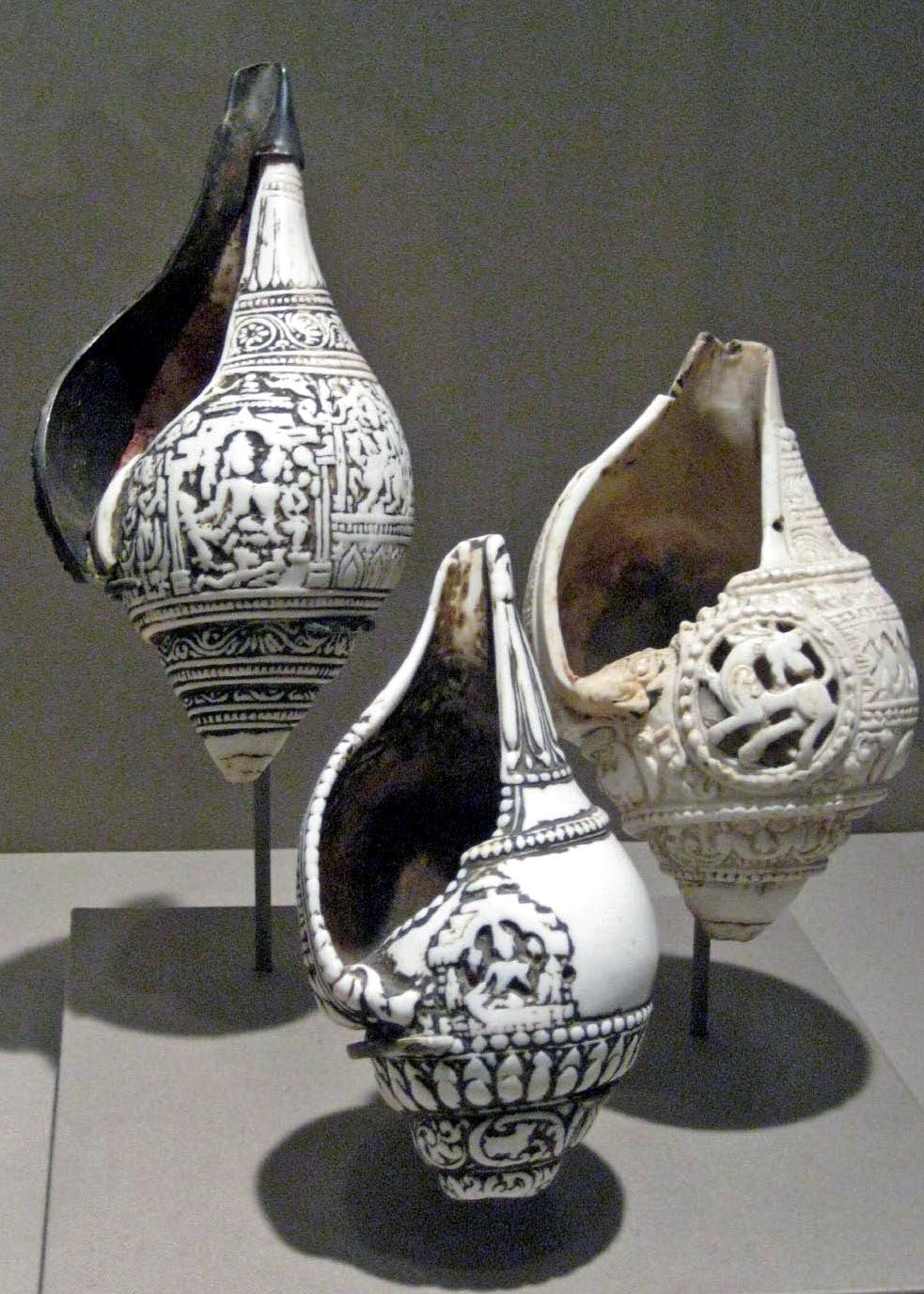
- Three carved dextral shells of Turbinella pyrum from 11th century India, see shankha

Scientific classification
- Kingdom: Animalia
- Phylum: Mollusca
- Class: Gastropoda
- Subclass: Caenogastropoda
- Order: Neogastropoda
- Family: Turbinellidae
- Genus: Turbinella
- Species: T. pyrum

Binomial name
- Turbinella pyrum Linnaeus, 1758

Synonyms
- Buccinella caerulea Perry, 1811

= Turbinella pyrum =

Species of gastropod

Turbinella pyrum, common names the chank shell, sacred chank or chank, also known as the divine conch or referred to simply as a conch, is a species of very large sea snail with a gill and an operculum, a marine gastropod mollusk in the family Turbinellidae. This species occurs in the Indian Ocean.

The name "chank" for the shell of this species is derived from the Indian word shankha, the divine conch. The old generic name was Xancus. The Dutch used to call them chianco.

== Distribution ==
This species is found mainly in the Indian Ocean.

== Description ==
The shell of this species is massive, with three or four prominent columellar plicae. It is usually pure white under a heavy brown periostracum, but it can also be a pale apricot color. It can sometimes be dotted with dark brown.

Shells of the lightning whelk (Sinistrofulgur sp.), a normally left-handed western Atlantic Ocean genus, are sometimes sold in imitation of the rare left-handed shells of the Turbinella species.,

== Human use ==
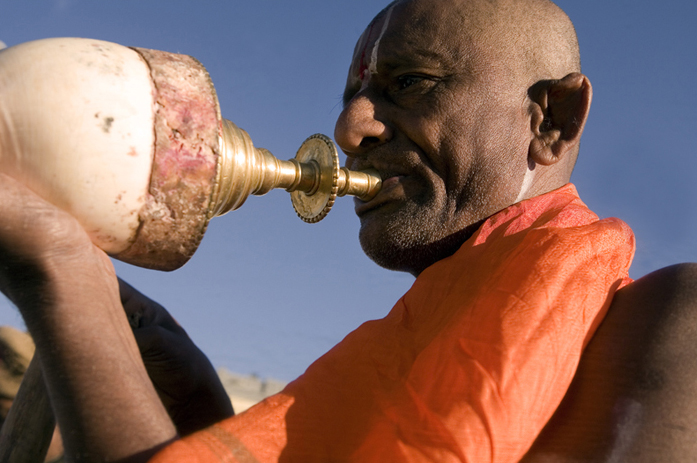
Hindu priest blowing a trumpet made out of a large shell of Turbinella pyrum, in Tirupati, India

The shell has considerable significance in Hinduism and Buddhism. It is considered to be sacred and is one of the eight auspicious symbols. In these religious contexts, the shell is sometimes modified by having the tip of the spire cut off, so it can be blown as a ceremonial trumpet. Some shells used in this way are decorated with metal and semiprecious stones.

Like most other gastropods, the shell of this species is almost always right-handed, or dextral, in its shell-coiling, but very rarely a left-handed shell is found (one in approximately 200,000 individuals). In the Hindu religious context, the very rare left-handed (sinistral) shells of this species are known as Dakshinavarti Shankh in Sanskrit or Valampuri shankhu in Tamil, as opposed to the more common right-handed forms, which are known as Vamavarti or Edampuri shankhu. The Dakshinavarti is particularly highly valued in terms of its religious significance.

In its religious context, the Dakshinavarti shankh is considered to be right-handed, because the "handedness" of the shell coiling is measured with the "spout" or siphonal canal of the shell pointing upwards. This is the opposite orientation to that which students of malacology use when assigning "handedness" to a shell.

== See also ==
- The West Indian chank shell, Turbinella angulata (Lightfoot, 1786)
