= Fusinus chuni =

Scientific classification
- Kingdom: Animalia
- Phylum: Mollusca
- Class: Gastropoda
- Subclass: Caenogastropoda
- Order: Neogastropoda
- Family: Fasciolariidae
- Genus: Fusinus
- Species: F. chuni

Binomial name
- Fusinus chuni (Martens, 1904)

Synonyms
- Fusinus verrucosus var. chuni Martens, 1904; Fusus verrucosus var. chuni Martens, 1904

Species of gastropod

Fusinus chuni is a species of sea snail, a marine gastropod mollusk in the family Fasciolariidae, the spindle snails, the tulip snails and their allies.
