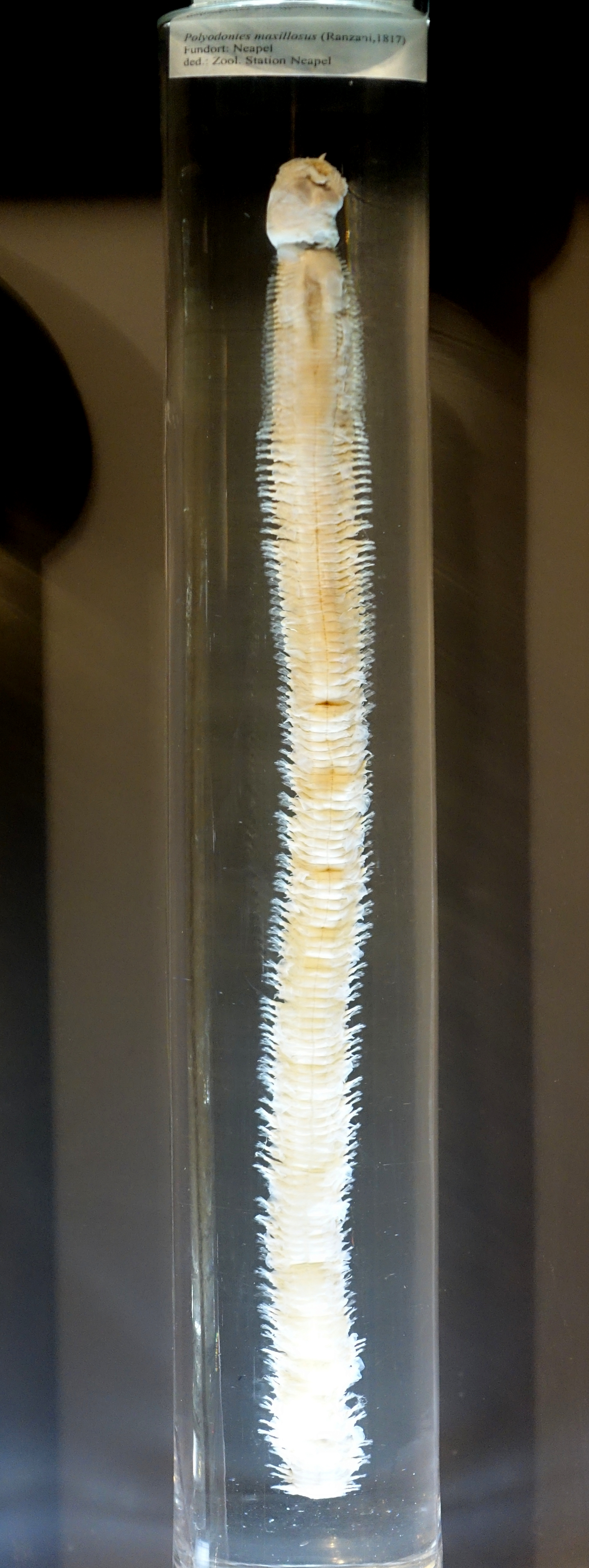
- Polyodontes maxillosus

Scientific classification
- Kingdom: Animalia
- Phylum: Annelida
- Clade: Pleistoannelida
- Subclass: Errantia
- Order: Phyllodocida
- Family: Acoetidae
- Genus: Polyodontes; Blainville, 1828

= Polyodontes =

Genus of annelid worms

Polyodontes is a genus of polychaete worms in the order Phyllodocida.

== Species ==
- Polyodontes atromarginatus Horst, 1917
- Polyodontes australiensis (McIntosh, 1885)
- Polyodontes frankenbergi Pettibone, 1989
- Polyodontes frons Hartman, 1939
- Polyodontes jolli Pettibone, 1989
- Polyodontes lupinus (Stimpson, 1856)
- Polyodontes maxillosus (Ranzani, 1817)
- Polyodontes oculea (Treadwell, 1901)
- Polyodontes oerstedi (Kinberg, 1855)
- Polyodontes panamensis (Chamberlin, 1919)
- Polyodontes renieri Grube, 1876
- Polyodontes sibogae Horst, 1917
- Polyodontes texanus Pettibone, 1989
- Polyodontes tidemani Pflugfelder, 1932
- Polyodontes vanderloosi Barnich & Steene, 2003
