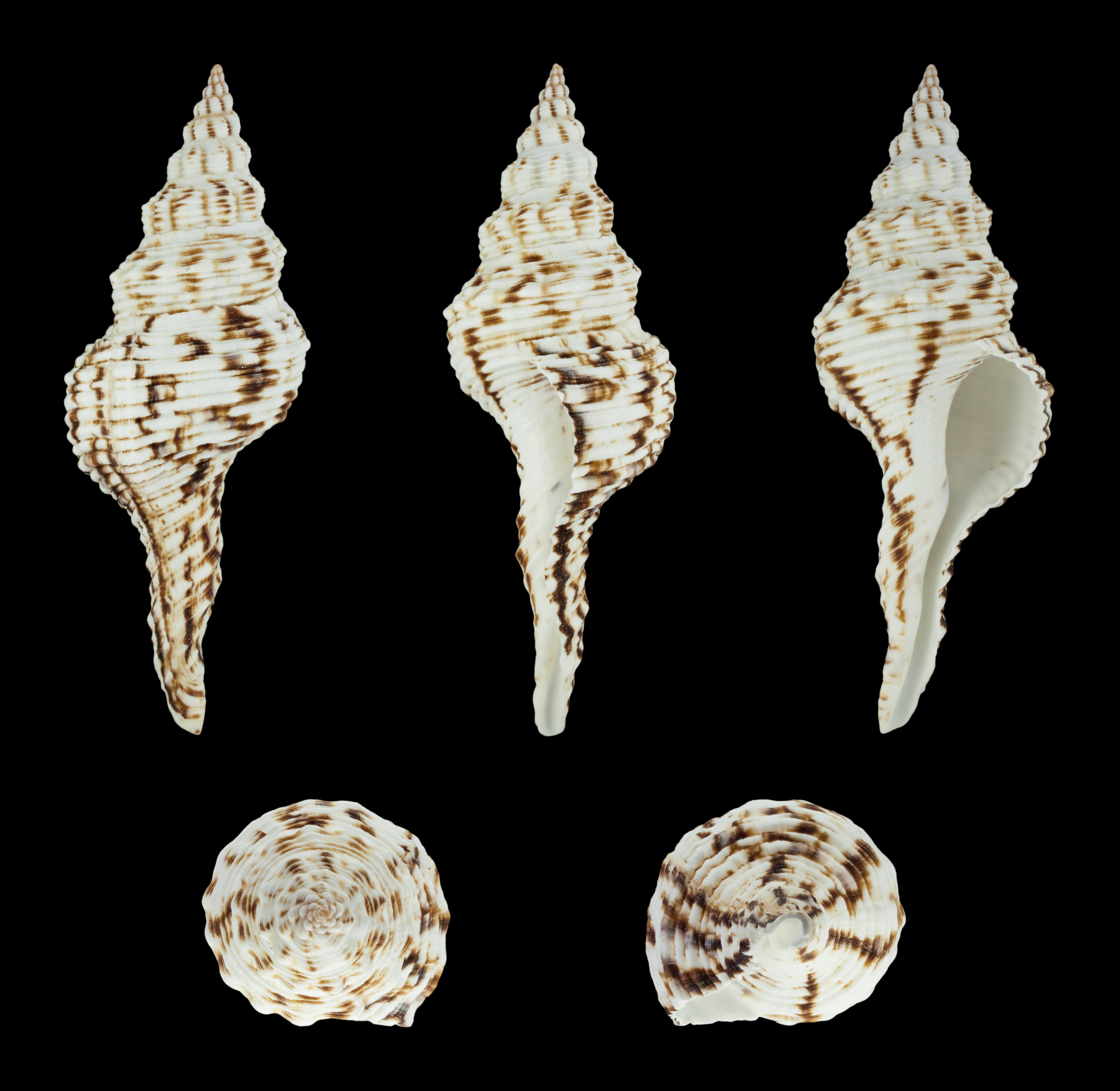

Scientific classification
- Kingdom: Animalia
- Phylum: Mollusca
- Class: Gastropoda
- Subclass: Caenogastropoda
- Order: Neogastropoda
- Family: Fasciolariidae
- Genus: Marmorofusus
- Species: M. nicobaricus

Binomial name
- Marmorofusus nicobaricus (Röding, 1798)

Synonyms
- Fusinus nicobaricus (Röding, 1798); Fusus (Colus) brenchleyi Baird, 1873; Fusus brenchleyi Baird, 1873; Fusus nicobaricus (Röding, 1798); Marmorofusus brenchleyi (Baird, 1873); Murex marmorata Röding, P.F., 1798; Syrinx marmorata Röding, 1798; Syrinx nicobaricus Röding, 1798

= Marmorofusus nicobaricus =

Species of gastropod

Marmorofusus nicobaricus, also known as the Nicobar spindle, is a species of sea snail in the family Fasciolariidae.

== Description ==
The shell size varies between 75 mm (3.0 in) and 180 mm (7.1 in).

== Distribution ==
This species occurs in the Pacific Ocean off Japan, New South Wales, Australia, New Guinea and Hawaii.
