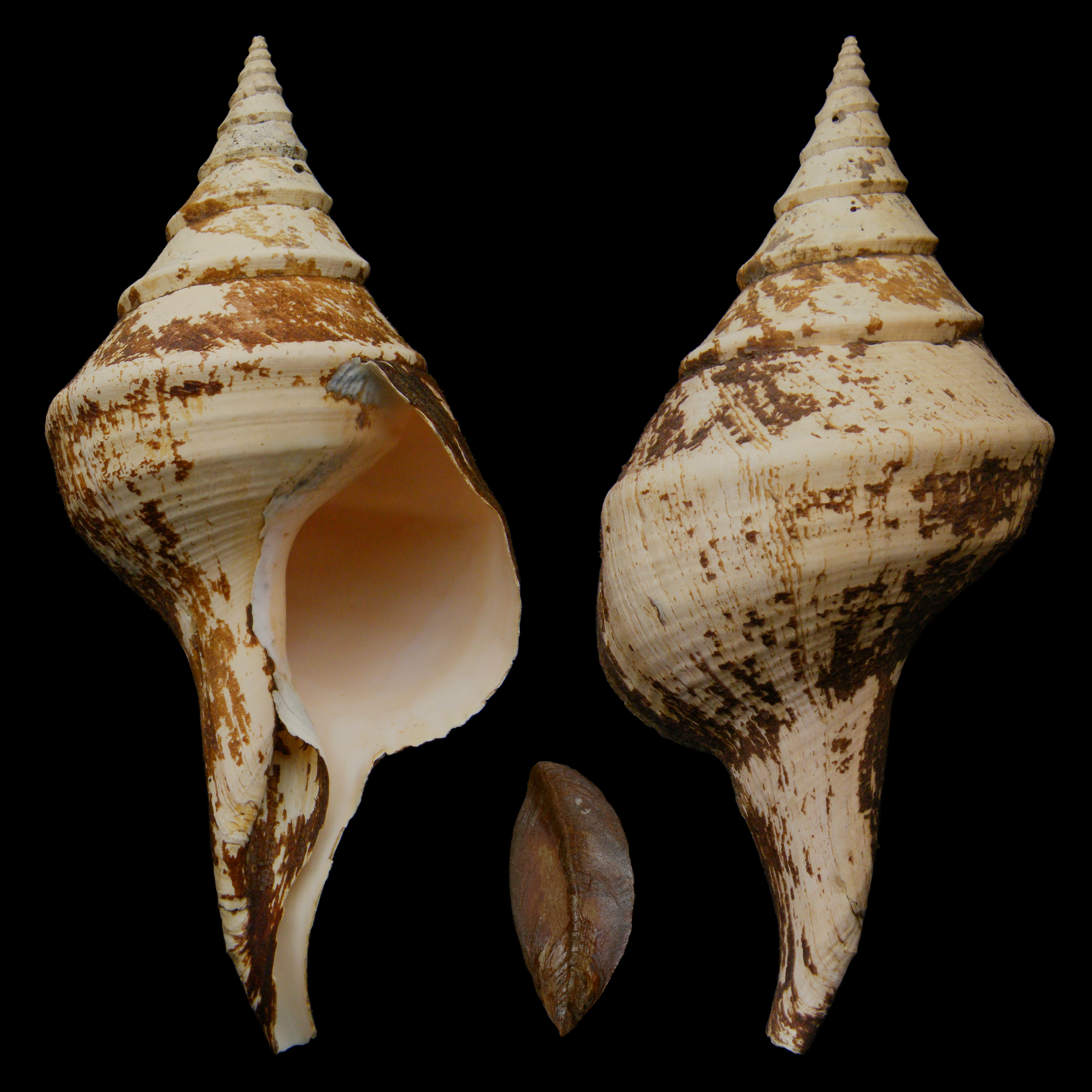
- Syrinx aruanus

Scientific classification
- Kingdom: Animalia
- Phylum: Mollusca
- Class: Gastropoda
- Subclass: Caenogastropoda
- Order: Neogastropoda
- Family: Turbinellidae
- Genus: Syrinx; Röding, 1798

species
- See text

= Syrinx (gastropod) =

Genus of gastropods

Syrinx is a monospecific genus of large sea snails with a gill and an operculum, marine gastropod mollusks in the family Turbinellidae.

== Distribution ==
This marine species can be found along the coasts of northern and western half of Australia and adjacent areas, including eastern Indonesia and Papua New Guinea.

== Species ==
- Syrinx aruanus (Linnaeus, 1758)
- Syrinx buccinoidea Röding, 1798 (nomen dubium)

Species brought into synonymy

- Syrinx annulata Röding, 1798: synonym of Pustulatirus annulatus (Röding, 1798)
- Syrinx marmorata Röding, 1798: synonym of Fusinus nicobaricus (Röding, 1798)
- Syrinx nicobaricus Röding, 1798: synonym of Fusinus nicobaricus (Röding, 1798)
- Syrinx producta Röding, 1798: synonym of Fusinus longissimus (Gmelin, 1791)
