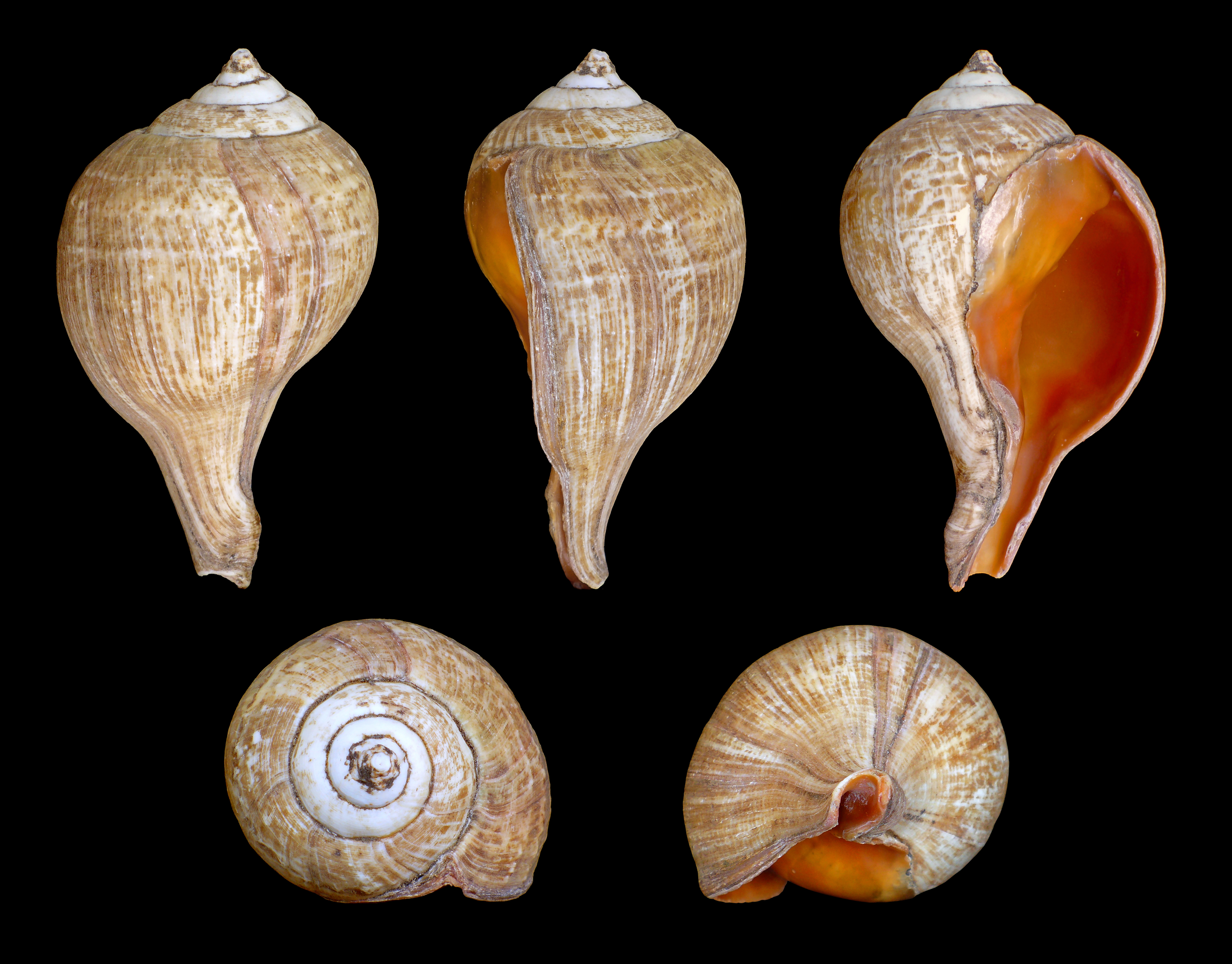
- Turbinella pyrum

Scientific classification
- Kingdom: Animalia
- Phylum: Mollusca
- Class: Gastropoda
- Subclass: Caenogastropoda
- Order: Neogastropoda
- Superfamily: Turbinelloidea
- Family: Turbinellidae; Swainson, 1835

Genera
- See text

Synonyms
- Scolyminae Swainson, 1840; Turbinellinae Swainson, 1835 superseded rank; Xancidae Pilsbry, 1922

= Turbinellidae =

Family of sea snails

Turbinellidae are a family of sea snails, marine gastropod mollusks in the clade Neogastropoda. Members of this family are predators.

== Distribution ==
Species in this family are found worldwide, mostly in tropical shallow waters but some in deep waters.

== Genera ==
- Cryptofusus Beu, 2011
- † Fascioplex Marwick, 1934
- † Fimbrivasum Squires & Saul, 2001 †
- † Fyfea H. J. Finlay & Marwick, 1937 †
- † Latirogona Laws, 1944
- † Pisanella Koenen, 1865
- Syrinx Röding, 1798
- Turbinella Lamarck, 1799

== Subfamilies ==
- subfamily Columbariinae Tomlin, 1928: synonym of Columbariidae Tomlin, 1928
- subfamily Tudiclinae Cossmann, 1901: synonym of Tudiclidae Cossmann, 1901 (superseded rank)
- subfamily Vasinae H. Adams & A. Adams, 1853 (1840): synonym of Vasidae H. Adams & A. Adams, 1853 (superseded rank)
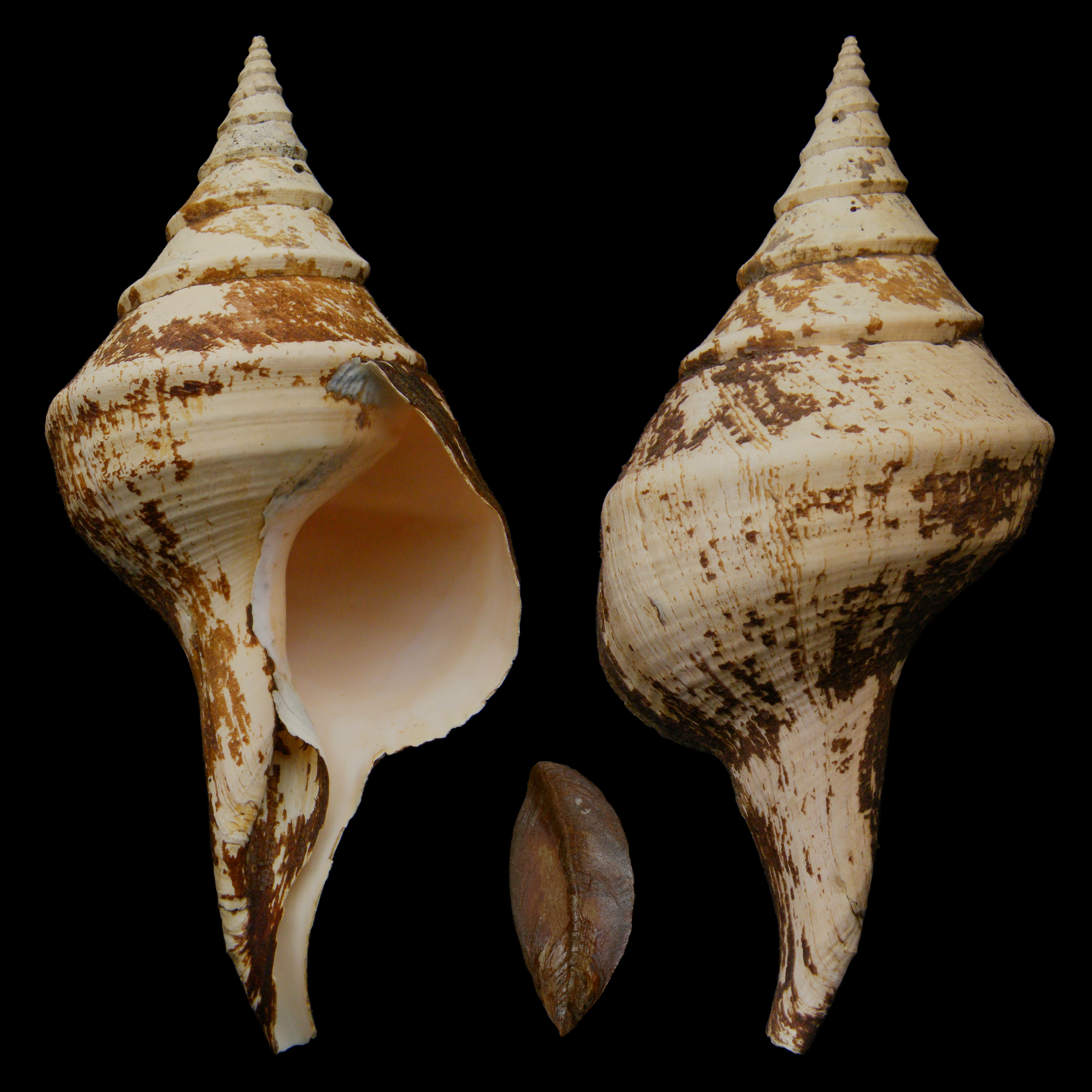
Syrinx aruanus

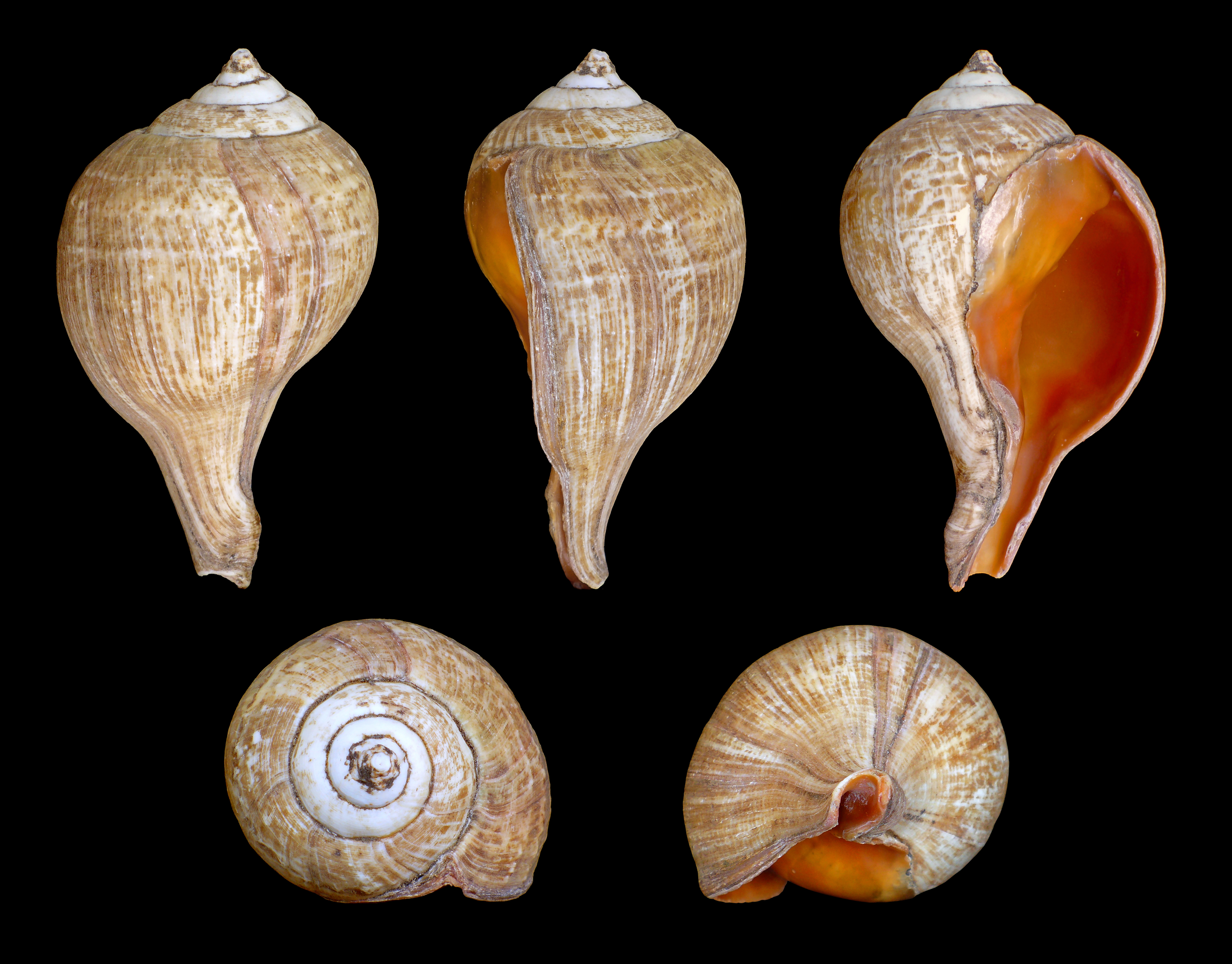
Turbinella pyrum

Genera brought into synonymy

- Buccinella Perry, 1811 : synonym of Turbinella Lamarck, 1799
- Cynodonta Schumacher, 1817 : synonym of Vasum Röding, 1798
- Megalatractus P. Fischer, 1884: synonym of Syrinx Röding, 1798 (junior subjective synonym)
- Perostylus Pilsbry, 1894: synonym of Syrinx Röding, 1798 (unaccepted > junior subjective synonym)
- Scolymus Swainson, 1835: synonym of Turbinella Lamarck, 1799 (junior subjective synonym)
- Surculina Dall, 1908: synonym of Exilia Conrad, 1860
- Tudicula H. Adams & A. Adams, 1864 : synonym of Tudivasum Rosenberg & Petit, 1987
- Xancus Röding, 1798: synonym of Turbinella Lamarck, 1799 (placed on the Official Index by ICZN Opinion 489)
