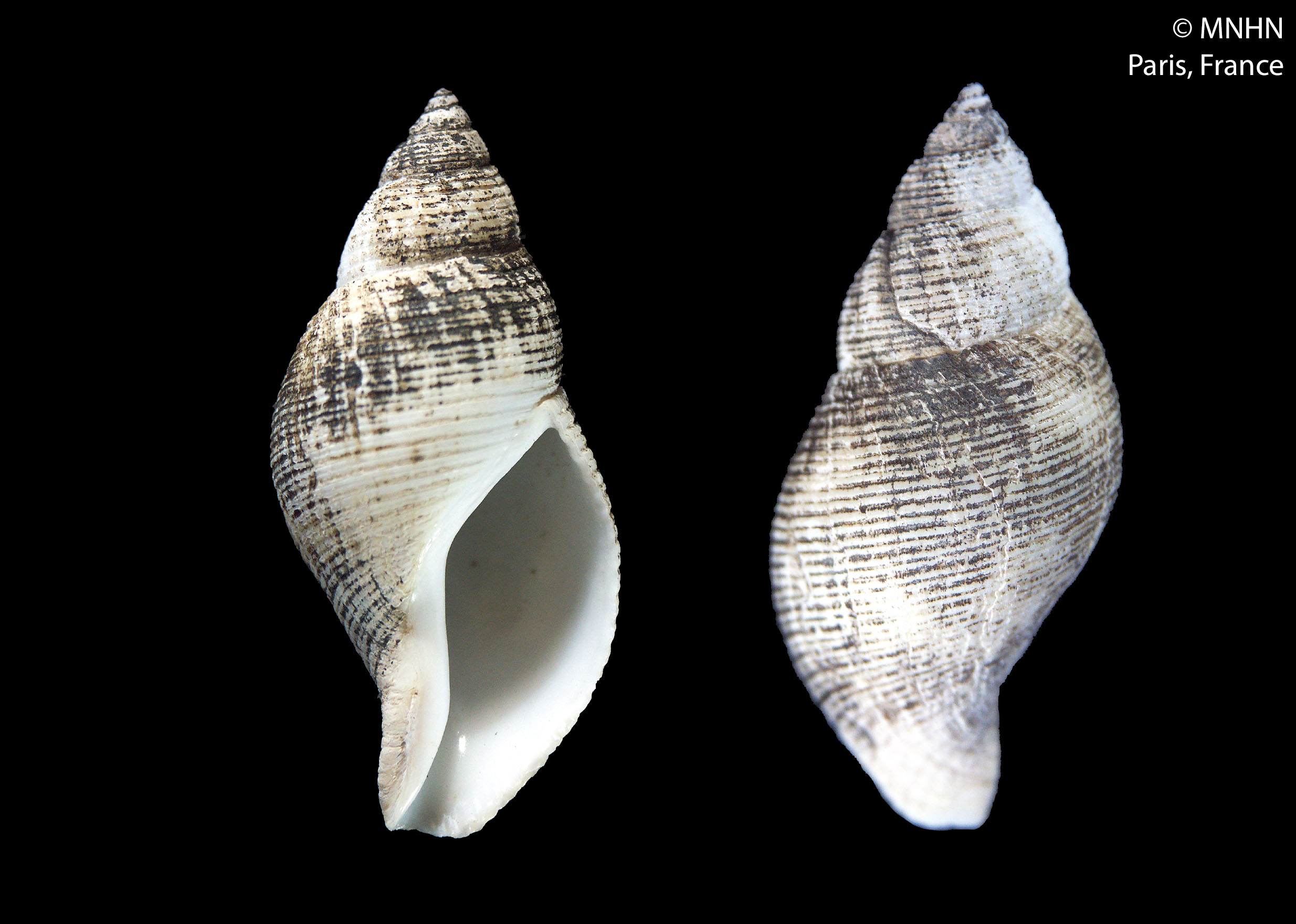
- Shell of Eosipho smithi (specimen at MNHN, Paris)

Scientific classification
- Kingdom: Animalia
- Phylum: Mollusca
- Class: Gastropoda
- Subclass: Caenogastropoda
- Order: Neogastropoda
- Superfamily: Buccinoidea
- Family: Eosiphonidae
- Genus: Eosipho; Thiele, 1929

Type species
- Chrysodomus smithi Schepman, 1911

Synonyms
- Neptunea (Eosipho) Thiele, 1929; Sipho (Eosipho) Thiele, 1929

= Eosipho =

Genus of gastropods

Eosipho is a genus of sea snails, marine gastropod mollusks in the family Eosiphonidae, the true whelks and their allies.

== Species ==
Species within the genus Eosipho include:

- † Eosipho cinguliferus (De Cristofori & Jan, 1832)
- † Eosipho hoernesi (Bellardi, 1873)
- † Eosipho latesulcatus (Bellardi, 1872)
- Eosipho smithi (Schepman, 1911)

Species brought into synonymy

- Eosipho aldermenensis (Powell, 1971): synonym of Calagrassor aldermenensis (Powell, 1971)
- Eosipho auzendei Warén & Bouchet, 2001: synonym of Enigmaticolus auzendei (Warén & Bouchet, 2001)
- Eosipho atlanticus Fraussen & Hadorn, 2005: synonym of Manaria atlantica (Fraussen & Hadorn, 2005) (original combination; inclusion in Manaria tentative)
- Eosipho canetae (Clench & Aguayo, 1944): synonym of Manaria canetae (Clench & Aguayo, 1944)
- Eosipho coriolis Bouchet & Waren, 1986: synonym of Gaillea coriolis (Bouchet & Warén, 1986)
- Eosipho dentatus (Schepman, 1911): synonym of Preangeria dentata (Schepman, 1911)
- Eosipho desbruyeresi Okutani & Ohta, 1993: synonym of Enigmaticolus desbruyeresi (Okutani & Ohta, 1993)
- Eosipho engonia Bouchet & Warén, 1986: synonym of Gaillea engonia (Bouchet & Warén, 1986)
- Eosipho hayashi (Shikama, 1971): synonym of Calagrassor hayashii (Shikama, 1971)
- Eosipho poppei Fraussen, 2001: synonym of Calagrassor poppei (Fraussen, 2001)
- Eosipho tashiensis (Lee & Lan, 2002): synonym of Calagrassor tashiensis (Lee & Lan, 2002)
- Eosipho thorybopus Bouchet & Waren, 1986: synonym of Manaria thorybopus (Bouchet & Warén, 1986)
- Eosipho tosaensis Okutani & Iwahori, 1992: synonym of Gaillea tosaensis (Okutani & Iwahori, 1992)
- Eosipho zephyrus Fraussen, Sellanes & Stahlschmidt, 2012: synonym of Calagrassor zephyrus (Fraussen, Sellanes & Stahlschmidt, 2012)
