= Americominella perminuta =

Scientific classification
- Kingdom: Animalia
- Phylum: Mollusca
- Class: Gastropoda
- Subclass: Caenogastropoda
- Order: Neogastropoda
- Family: Eosiphonidae
- Genus: Americominella
- Species: A. perminuta

Binomial name
- Americominella perminuta (Dall, 1927)

Synonyms
- Chrysodomus (Siphonorbis) perminuta Dall, 1927 (original combination); Fusus perminutus (Dall, 1927); Siphonorbis perminutus Dall, 1927

Species of gastropod

Americominella perminuta is a species of sea snail, a marine gastropod mollusk in the family Eosiphonidae, the whelks and their allies.

== Distribution ==
Americominella perminuta are found in the North Atlantic Ocean and were first found off the coast of Georgia in the southern United States.
