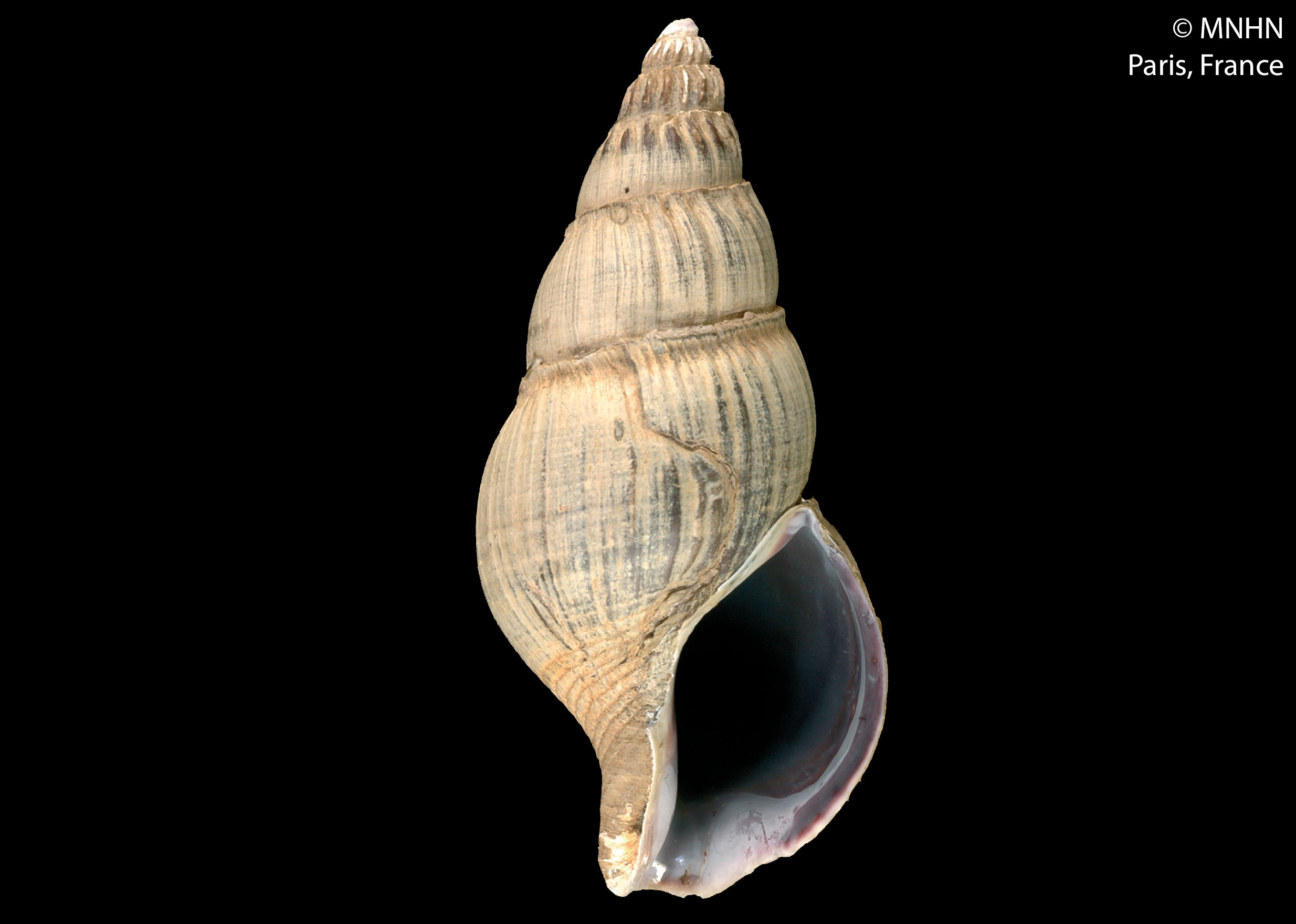
- Shell of Enigmaticolus nipponensis (specimen at MNHN, Paris)

Scientific classification
- Kingdom: Animalia
- Phylum: Mollusca
- Class: Gastropoda
- Subclass: Caenogastropoda
- Order: Neogastropoda
- Family: Eosiphonidae
- Genus: Enigmaticolus
- Species: E. nipponensis

Binomial name
- Enigmaticolus nipponensis Fraussen, 2008

Synonyms
- Enigmaticolus inflatus S.-Q. Zhang, S.-P. Zhang & H. Chen, 2020; Enigmaticolus monnieri Fraussen, 2008; Eosipho desbruyeresi nipponensis Okutani & Fujiwara, 2000 (basionym)

= Enigmaticolus nipponensis =

Species of gastropod

Enigmaticolus nipponensis is a species of sea snail, a marine gastropod mollusc in the family Eosiphonidae, the true whelks and their allies.

== Description ==
The length of the shell attains 63.7 mm.

== Distribution ==
This marine species occurs off Madagascar and in the Okinawa Trough.
