= Enigmaticolus auzendei =

Scientific classification
- Kingdom: Animalia
- Phylum: Mollusca
- Class: Gastropoda
- Subclass: Caenogastropoda
- Order: Neogastropoda
- Family: Eosiphonidae
- Genus: Enigmaticolus
- Species: E. auzendei

Binomial name
- Enigmaticolus auzendei (Warén & Bouchet, 2001)

Synonyms
- Eosipho auzendei Warén & Bouchet, 2001

Species of gastropod

Enigmaticolus auzendei is a species of sea snail, a marine gastropod mollusk in the family Buccinidae, the true whelks.
