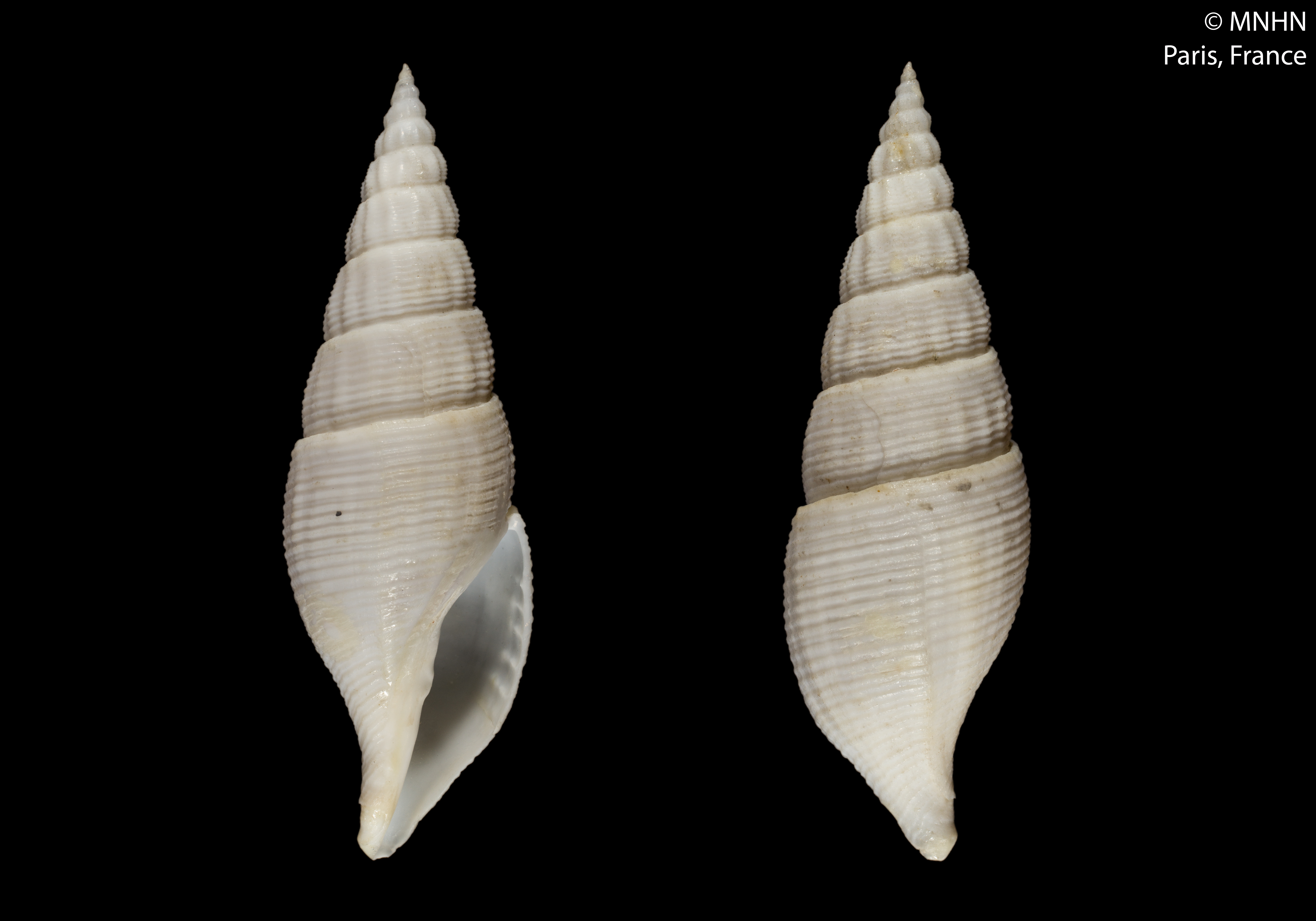

Scientific classification
- Kingdom: Animalia
- Phylum: Mollusca
- Class: Gastropoda
- Subclass: Caenogastropoda
- Order: Neogastropoda
- Family: Eosiphonidae
- Genus: Manaria
- Species: M. chinoi

Binomial name
- Manaria chinoi Fraussen, 2005

= Manaria chinoi =

Species of gastropod

Manaria chinoi is a species of sea snail, a marine gastropod mollusk in the family Eosiphonidae, the true whelks.

== Description ==
An operculated species. Shell size 80-85 mm.

== Distribution ==
Philippines.
