= Warenius nankaiensis =

Scientific classification
- Kingdom: Animalia
- Phylum: Mollusca
- Class: Gastropoda
- Subclass: Caenogastropoda
- Order: Neogastropoda
- Family: Eosiphonidae
- Genus: Warenius
- Species: W. nankaiensis

Binomial name
- Warenius nankaiensis (Okutani & Iwasaki, 2003)

Synonyms
- Calliloncha nankaiensis Okutani & Iwasaki, 2003 (original combination)

Species of gastropod

Warenius nankaiensis is a species of sea snail, a marine gastropod mollusk in the family Eosiphonidae, the true whelks and their allies.

== Distribution ==
This marine species occurs off Japan.
