= Manaria burkeae =

Scientific classification
- Kingdom: Animalia
- Phylum: Mollusca
- Class: Gastropoda
- Subclass: Caenogastropoda
- Order: Neogastropoda
- Family: Eosiphonidae
- Genus: Manaria
- Species: M. burkeae

Binomial name
- Manaria burkeae Garcia, 2008

Species of gastropod

Manaria burkeae is a species of sea snail, a marine gastropod mollusc in the family Eosiphonidae, the true whelks.
