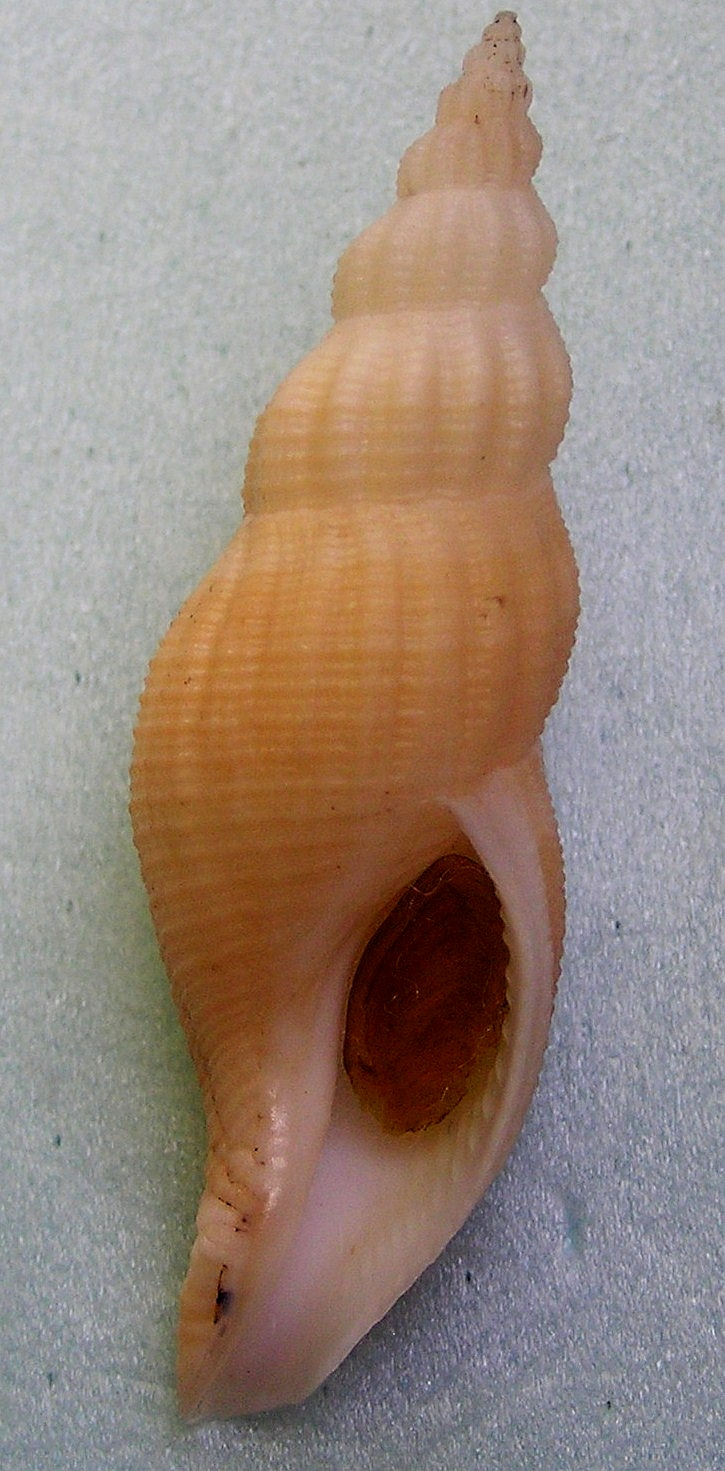
- Apertural view of Manaria fusiformis

Scientific classification
- Kingdom: Animalia
- Phylum: Mollusca
- Class: Gastropoda
- Subclass: Caenogastropoda
- Order: Neogastropoda
- Family: Eosiphonidae
- Genus: Manaria; E.A. Smith, 1906

Type species
- Manaria thurstoni E. A. Smith, 1906

= Manaria (gastropod) =

Genus of gastropods

Manaria is a genus of sea snails, marine gastropod mollusks in the family Eosiphonidae, the true whelks and their allies.

== Species ==
Species within the genus Manaria include:

- Manaria astrolabis Fraussen & Stahlschmidt, 2016
- Manaria atlantica (Fraussen & Hadorn, 2005)
- Manaria borbonica Fraussen & Stahlschmidt, 2016
- Manaria brevicaudata (Schepman, 1911)
- Manaria burkeae Garcia, 2008
- Manaria chinoi Fraussen, 2005
- Manaria circumsonaxa Fraussen & Stahlschmidt, 2016
- Manaria clandestina Bouchet & Waren, 1986
- Manaria corindoni Fraussen & Stahlschmidt, 2016
- Manaria corporosis Fraussen & Stahlschmidt, 2016
- Manaria excalibur Fraussen & Stahlschmidt, 2016
- Manaria explicibilis Fraussen & Stahlschmidt, 2016
- Manaria fluentisona Fraussen & Stahlschmidt, 2016
- Manaria formosa Bouchet & Waren, 1986
- Manaria fusiformis (Clench & Aguayo, 1941)
- Manaria hadorni Fraussen & Stahlschmidt, 2016
- Manaria indomaris Fraussen & Stahlschmidt, 2016
- Manaria jonkeri (Koperberg, 1931)
- † Manaria koperbergae Fraussen & Stahlschmidt, 2016
- Manaria kuroharai Azuma, 1960
- Manaria lirata Azuma, 1960
- Manaria loculosa Fraussen & Stahlschmidt, 2016
- Manaria lozoueti Fraussen & Stahlschmidt, 2016
- Manaria makassarensis Bouchet & Waren, 1986
- Manaria terryni Fraussen & Stahlschmidt, 2016
- Manaria thorybopus (Bouchet & Warén, 1986)
- Manaria thurstoni Smith, 1906
- Manaria tongaensis Fraussen & Stahlschmidt, 2016
- Manaria tyrotarichoides Fraussen & Stahlschmidt, 2016
- † Manaria venemai (Koperberg, 1931)

synonyms

- Manaria callophorella Fraussen, 2004: synonym of Phaenomenella callophorella (Fraussen, 2004) (original combination)
- Manaria canetae (Clench & Aguayo, 1944): synonym of Gaillea canetae (Clench & Aguayo, 1944)
- Manaria galatheae (Powell, 1958): synonym of Aeneator galatheae Powell, 1958
- Manaria inflata Shikama, 1971: synonym of Phaenomenella inflata (Shikama, 1971) (original combination)
- Manaria insularis Okutani, 1986: synonym of Chryseofusus chrysodomoides (Schepman, 1911)
