= Preangeria =

Scientific classification
- Kingdom: Animalia
- Phylum: Mollusca
- Class: Gastropoda
- Subclass: Caenogastropoda
- Order: Neogastropoda
- Family: Eosiphonidae
- Genus: Preangeria; Martin, 1921

Type species
- † Preangeria angsanana K. Martin, 1921

Synonyms
- † Acanthinella Shuto, 1969

Extinct genus of sea snails

Preangeria is an extinct genus of gastropods belonging to the family Eosiphonidae.

The species of this genus are found in Malesia.

Species:

- † Preangeria angsanana K.Martin, 1921
- † Preangeria dentata (Schepman, 1911)
- † Preangeria javana (K.Martin, 1899)
- † Preangeria praeundosa (Vredenburg, 1924)
- † Preangeria sundaica (Oostingh, 1935)
- † Preangeria talahabensis K.Martin, 1921
