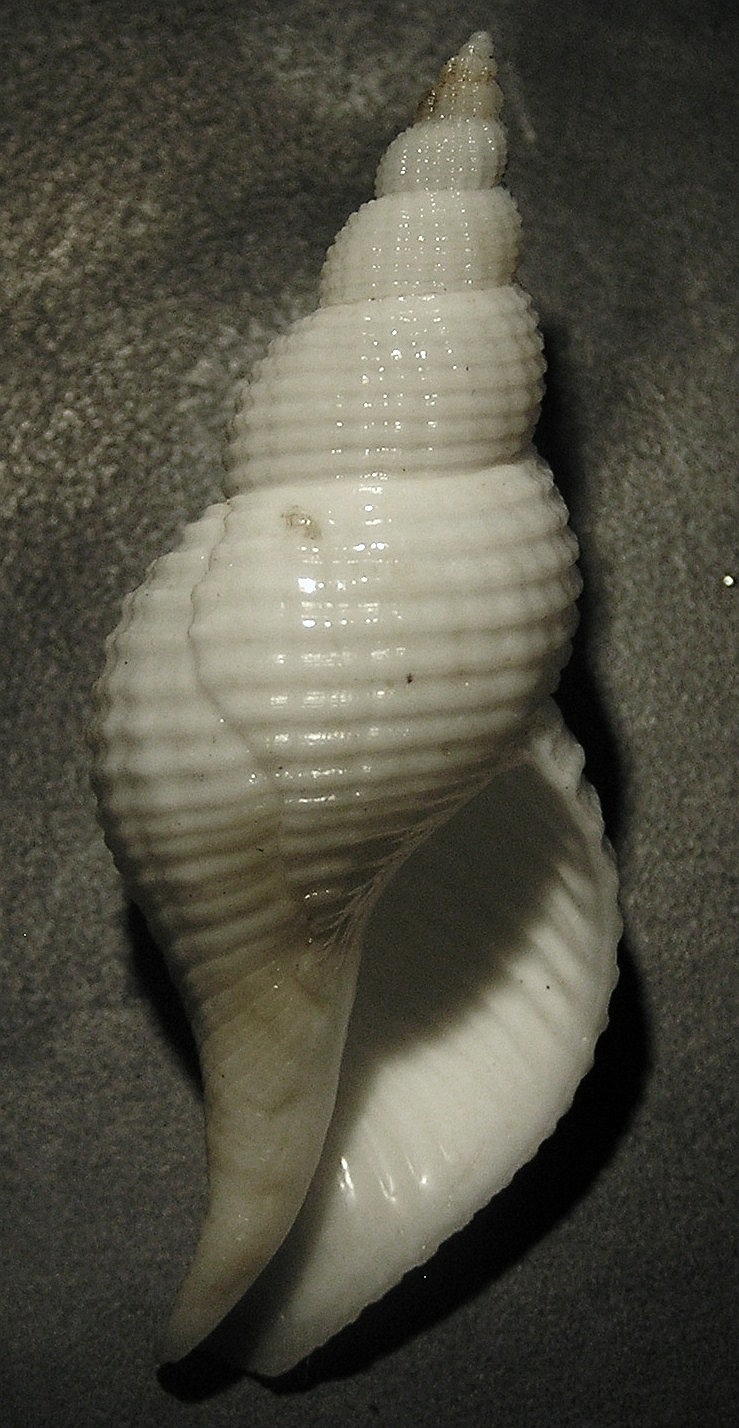

Scientific classification
- Kingdom: Animalia
- Phylum: Mollusca
- Class: Gastropoda
- Subclass: Caenogastropoda
- Order: Neogastropoda
- Family: Eosiphonidae
- Genus: Calagrassor
- Species: C. poppei

Binomial name
- Calagrassor poppei (Fraussen, 2001)

Synonyms
- Colus ryukyuensis Lan, 2002; Eosipho poppei Fraussen, 2001 (original combination)

= Calagrassor poppei =

Species of sea snail

Calagrassor poppei is a species of sea snail, a marine gastropod mollusk in the family Eosiphonidae, the true whelks and their allies.

== Description ==
A carnivorous and predatory sea snail found in the Philippines, this mollusk has a shell size that averages 16.6mm (0.65 inches)

Common name: Poppe's delicate whelk named for Guido T. Poppe, conchologist and museum-quality collector, photographer, and author active in the field since childhood.

The species is known to attain a size of 50+ mm. An operculum is present.

== Distribution ==
This marine species occurs off the Philippines.
