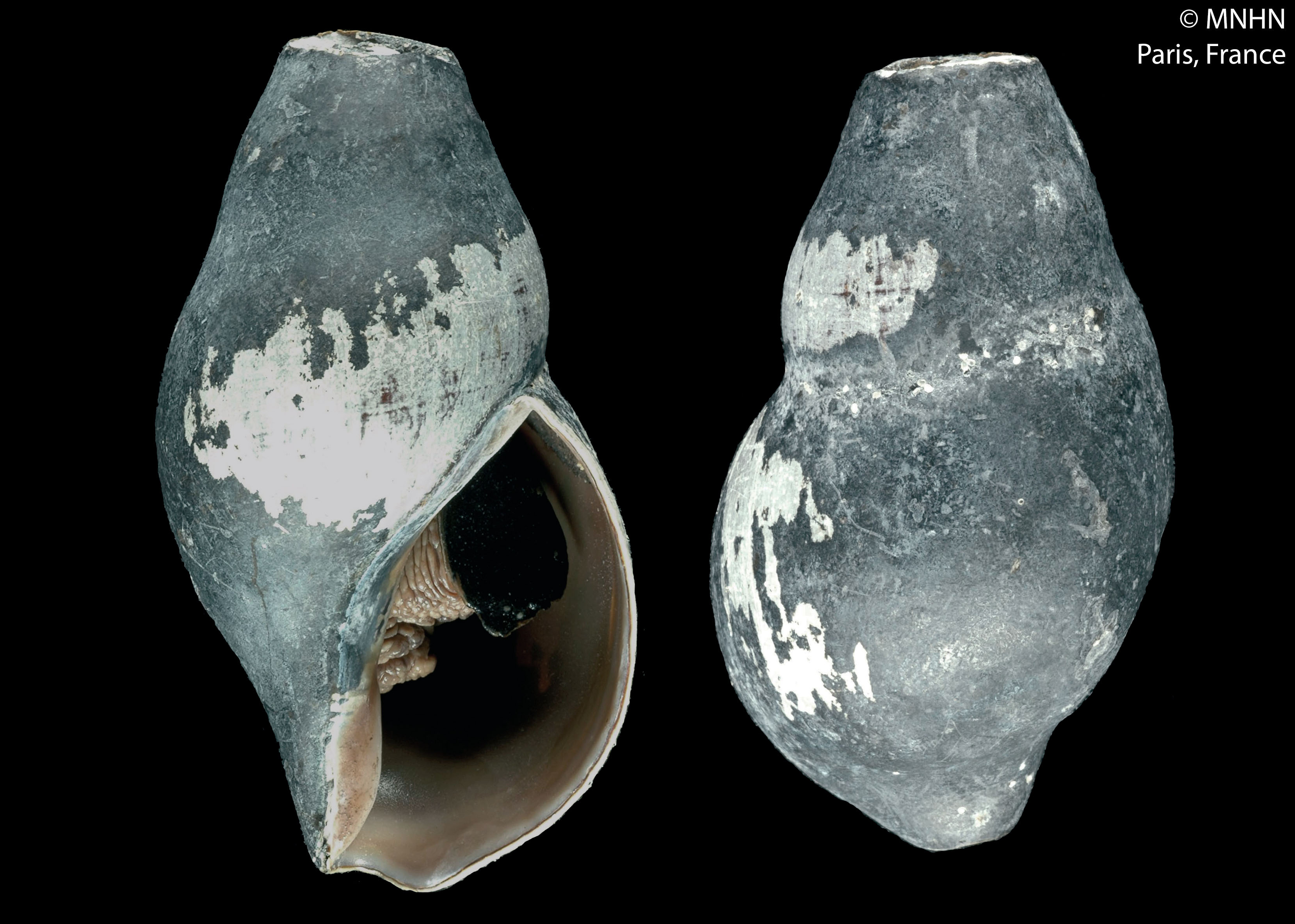

Scientific classification
- Kingdom: Animalia
- Phylum: Mollusca
- Class: Gastropoda
- Subclass: Caenogastropoda
- Order: Neogastropoda
- Family: Eosiphonidae
- Genus: Enigmaticolus
- Species: E. desbruyeresi

Binomial name
- Enigmaticolus desbruyeresi (Okutani & Ohta, 1993)

Synonyms
- Eosipho desbruyeresi Okutani & Ohta, 1993; Eosipho desbruyeresi nipponensis Okutani & Fujiwara, 2000

= Enigmaticolus desbruyeresi =

Species of gastropod

Enigmaticolus desbruyeresi is a species of sea snail, a marine gastropod mollusc in the family Eosiphonidae, the true whelks and their allies.

== Description ==
Easily distinguishable from all other Enigmaticolus species by the complete lack of a subsutural ramp. Also exhibits weak spiral cords on the base.

== Distribution ==
Found in hydrothermal vents in Manus, North Fiji, and Lau basins in the southwestern Pacific and off Luzon, Philippines. Individuals have been known to live 1456–2750 m deep.
