= Americominella =

Scientific classification
- Kingdom: Animalia
- Phylum: Mollusca
- Class: Gastropoda
- Subclass: Caenogastropoda
- Order: Neogastropoda
- Superfamily: Buccinoidea
- Family: Eosiphonidae
- Genus: Americominella; Klappenbach & Ureta, 1972

Genera
- See text

Genus of gastropods

Americominella is a genus of sea snails, marine gastropod mollusks in the family Eosiphonidae.

== Species ==
Species within the genus Afrocominella include:

- Americominella duartei Klappenbach & Ureta, 1972
- Americominella perminuta (Dall, 1927)

Synonyms

- Americominella longisetosus (De Castellanos & Fernandez, 1972): synonym of Americominella duartei Klappenbach & Ureta, 1972
