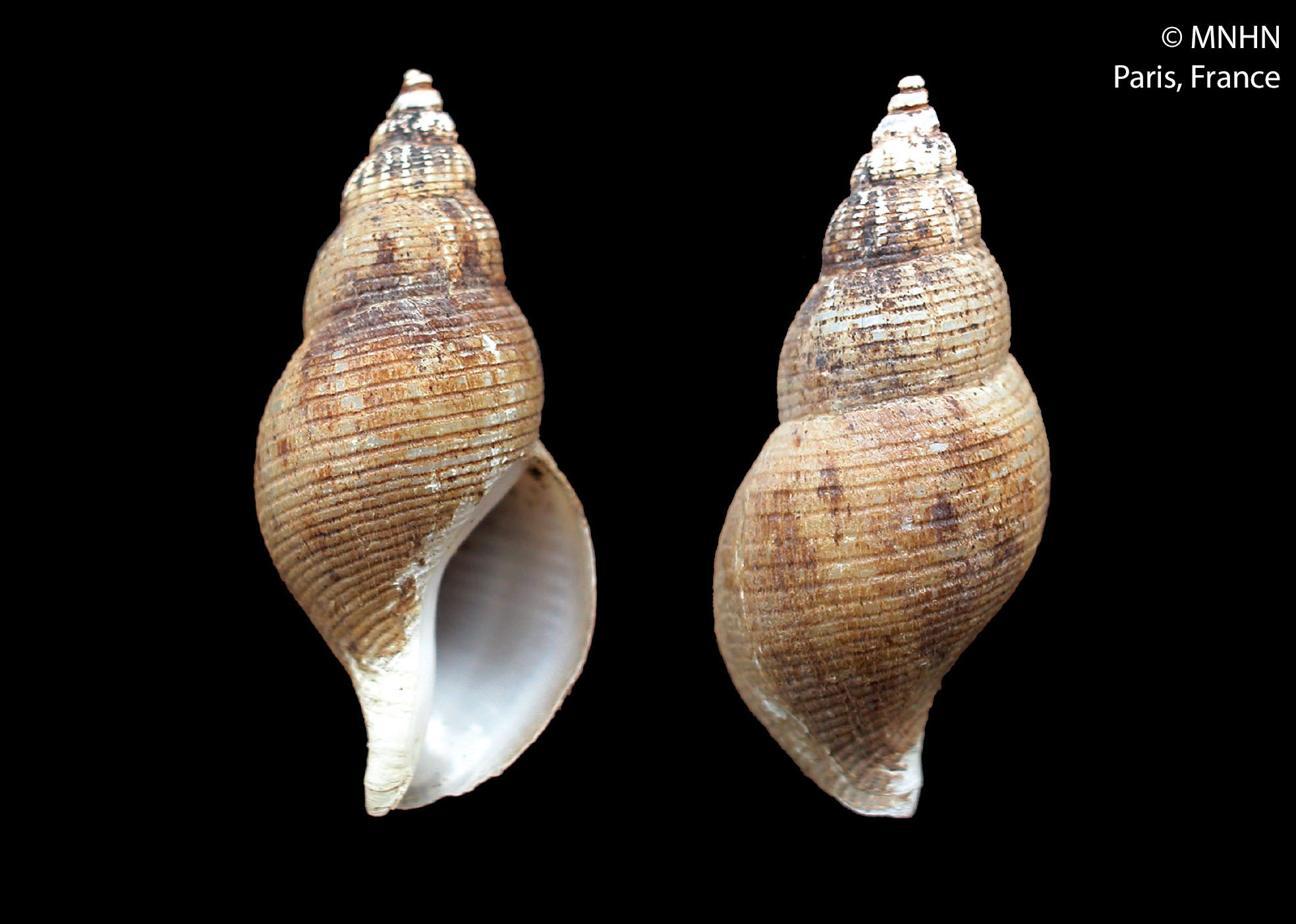
- Shell of Calagrassor tashiensis (specimen at MNHN, Paris)

Scientific classification
- Kingdom: Animalia
- Phylum: Mollusca
- Class: Gastropoda
- Subclass: Caenogastropoda
- Order: Neogastropoda
- Family: Eosiphonidae
- Genus: Calagrassor
- Species: C. tashiensis

Binomial name
- Calagrassor tashiensis (Lee & Lan, 2002)

Synonyms
- Colus tashiensis Lee & Lan, 2002 (original combination); Eosipho tashiensis (Lee & Lan, 2002)

= Calagrassor tashiensis =

Species of gastropod

Calagrassor tashiensis is a species of sea snail, a marine gastropod mollusk in the family Eosiphonidae, the true whelks and their allies.

== Distribution ==
This marine species occurs off Taiwan.
