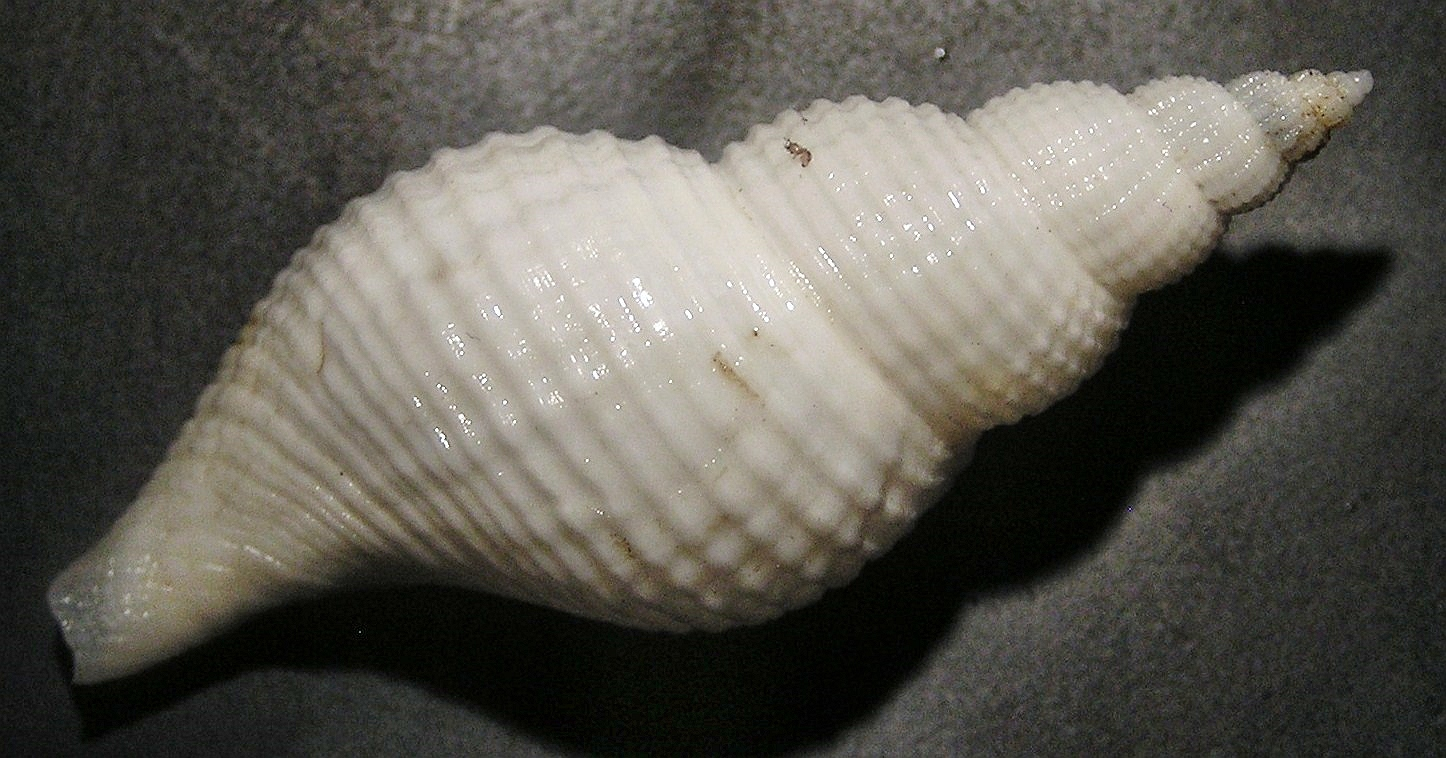
- Calagrassor poppei, abapertural view

Scientific classification
- Kingdom: Animalia
- Phylum: Mollusca
- Class: Gastropoda
- Subclass: Caenogastropoda
- Order: Neogastropoda
- Superfamily: Buccinoidea
- Family: Eosiphonidae
- Genus: Calagrassor; Kantor, Puillandre, Fraussen, Fedosov & Bouchet, 2013

Type species
- Cantharus aldermenensis Powell, 1971

= Calagrassor =

Genus of gastropods

Calagrassor is a genus of sea snails, marine gastropod mollusks in the family Eosiphonidae, the true whelks and their allies.

== Species ==
Species within the genus Calagrassor include:

- Calagrassor aldermenensis (Powell, 1971)
- Calagrassor analogus Fraussen, Chino & Stahlschmidt, 2017
- Calagrassor bacciballus Fraussen & Stahlschmidt, 2016
- Calagrassor delicatus Fraussen & Stahlschmidt, 2016
- Calagrassor hagai Fraussen, Chino & Stahlschmidt, 2017
- Calagrassor hayashii (Shikama, 1971)
- Calagrassor hespericus Fraussen & Stahlschmidt, 2016
- Calagrassor pidginoides Fraussen & Stahlschmidt, 2016
- Calagrassor poppei (Fraussen, 2001)
- Calagrassor tashiensis (Lee & Lan, 2002)
- Calagrassor zephyrus (Fraussen, Sellanes & Stahlschmidt, 2012)
