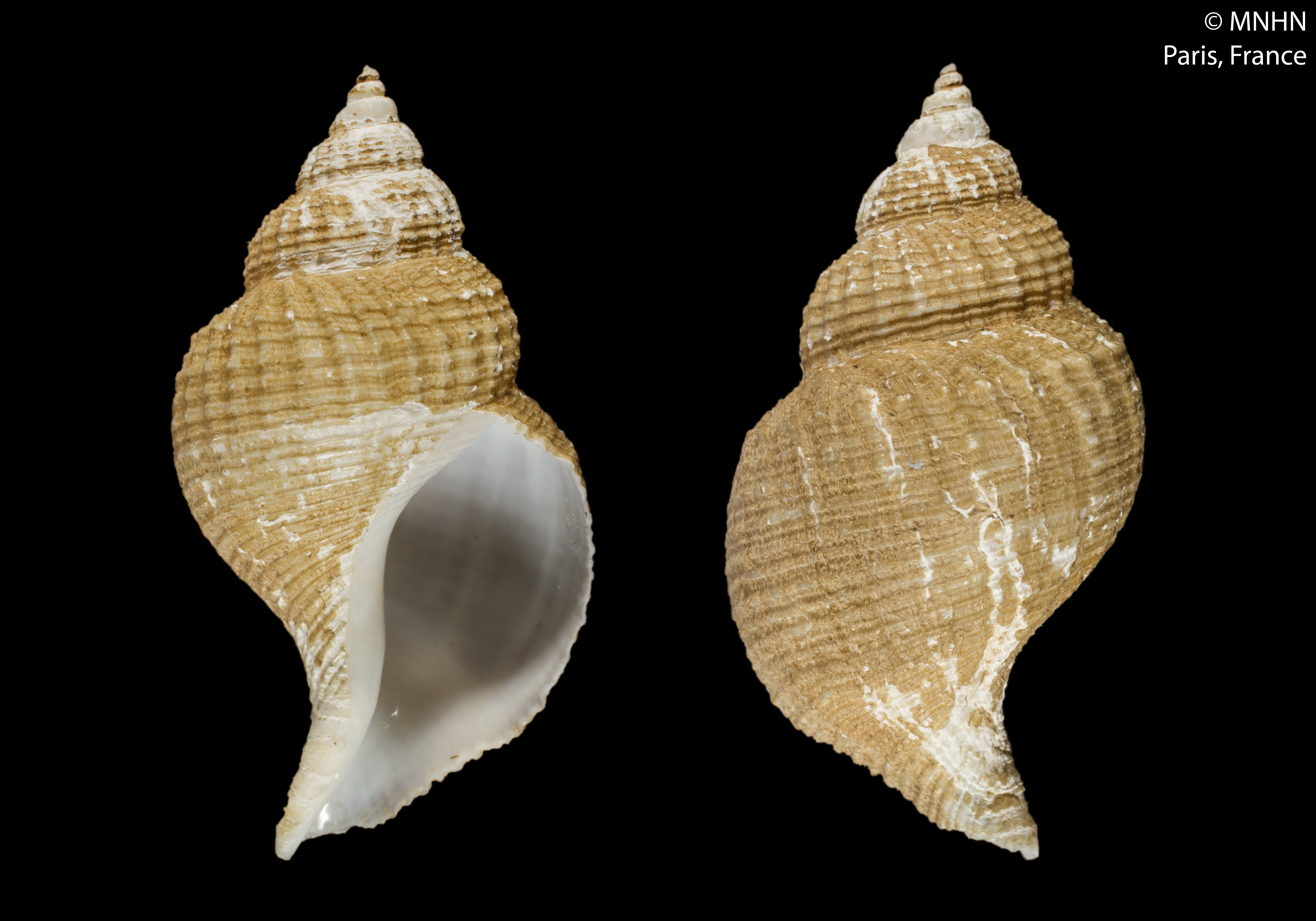
- Shell of Gaillea coriolis (holotype at MNHN, Paris)

Scientific classification
- Kingdom: Animalia
- Phylum: Mollusca
- Class: Gastropoda
- Subclass: Caenogastropoda
- Order: Neogastropoda
- Superfamily: Buccinoidea
- Family: Eosiphonidae
- Genus: Gaillea; Kantor, Puillandre, Fraussen, Fedosov & Bouchet, 2013

Type species
- Eosipho coriolis Bouchet & Warén, 1986

= Gaillea =

Genus of gastropods

Gaillea is a genus of sea snails, marine gastropod mollusks in the family Eosiphonidae.

== Species ==
Species within the genus Gaillea include:

- Gaillea canetae (Clench & Aguayo, 1944)
- Gaillea coriolis (Bouchet & Warén, 1986)
- Gaillea engonia (Bouchet & Warén, 1986)
- Gaillea tosaensis (Okutani & Iwahori, 1992)
