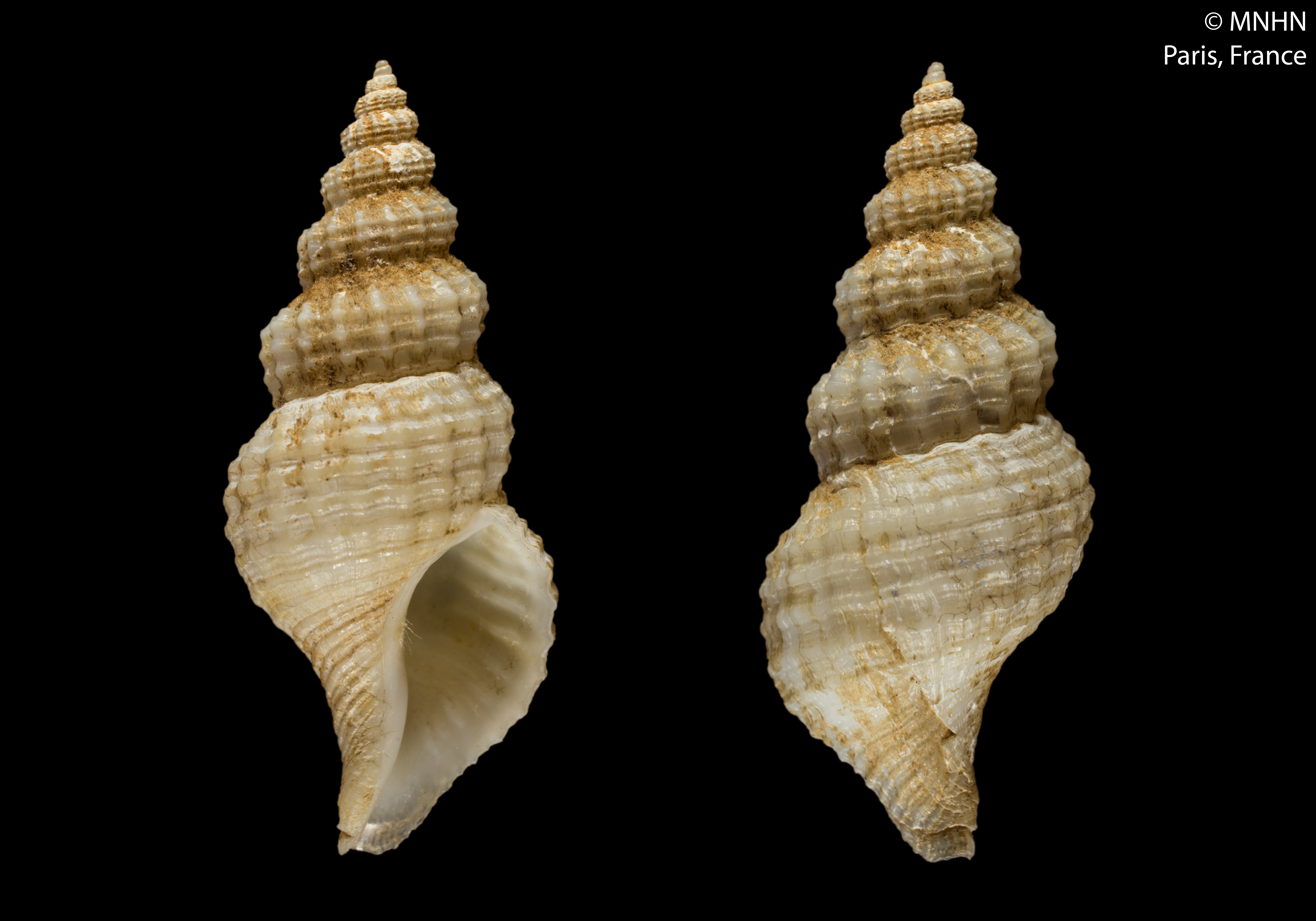

Scientific classification
- Kingdom: Animalia
- Phylum: Mollusca
- Class: Gastropoda
- Subclass: Caenogastropoda
- Order: Neogastropoda
- Family: Eosiphonidae
- Genus: Manaria
- Species: M. atlantica

Binomial name
- Manaria atlantica (Fraussen & Hadorn, 2005)

Synonyms
- Eosipho atlanticus Fraussen & Hadorn, 2005 (original combination; inclusion in Manaria tentative)

= Manaria atlantica =

Species of gastropod

Manaria atlantica is a species of sea snail, a marine gastropod mollusk in the family Eosiphonidae, the true whelk and their alliess.

== Distribution ==
This marine species occurs off Guadeloupe.

== Description ==
The size of the shell attains 27 mm (1.1 in).
