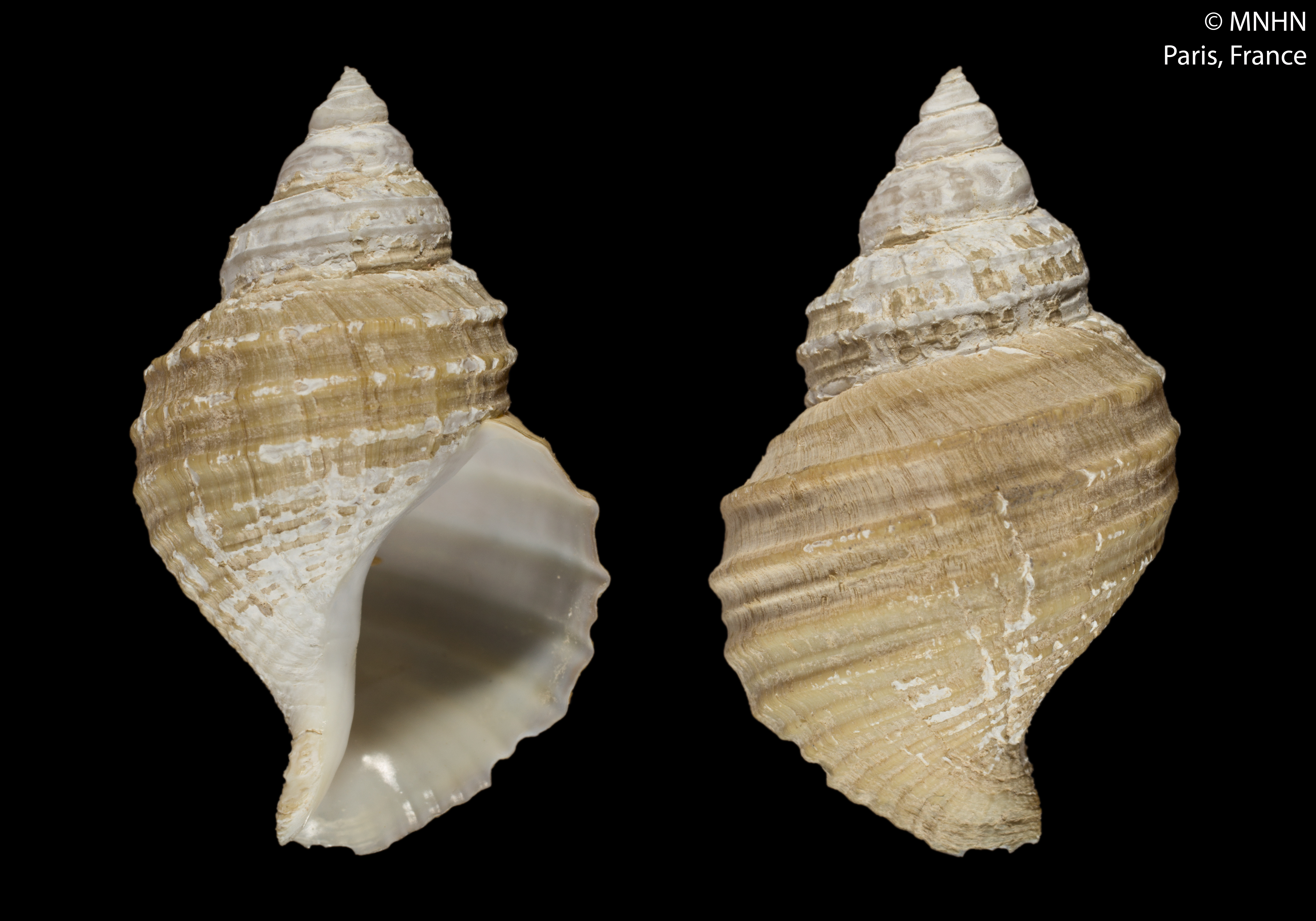
- Shell of Warenius crosnieri (holotype at MNHN, Paris)

Scientific classification
- Kingdom: Animalia
- Phylum: Mollusca
- Class: Gastropoda
- Subclass: Caenogastropoda
- Order: Neogastropoda
- Family: Eosiphonidae
- Genus: Warenius; Kantor, Kosyan, Sorokin, Herbert & Fedosov, 2020

Type species
- Costaria crosnieri Bouchet & Warén, 1986

= Warenius =

Genus of gastropods

Warenius is a genus of sea snails, marine gastropod mollusks in the family Eosiphonidae, the true whelks and their allies.

== Species ==
Species within the genus Warenius include:

- Warenius crosnieri (Bouchet & Warén, 1986)
- Warenius nankaiensis (Okutani & Iwasaki, 2003)
