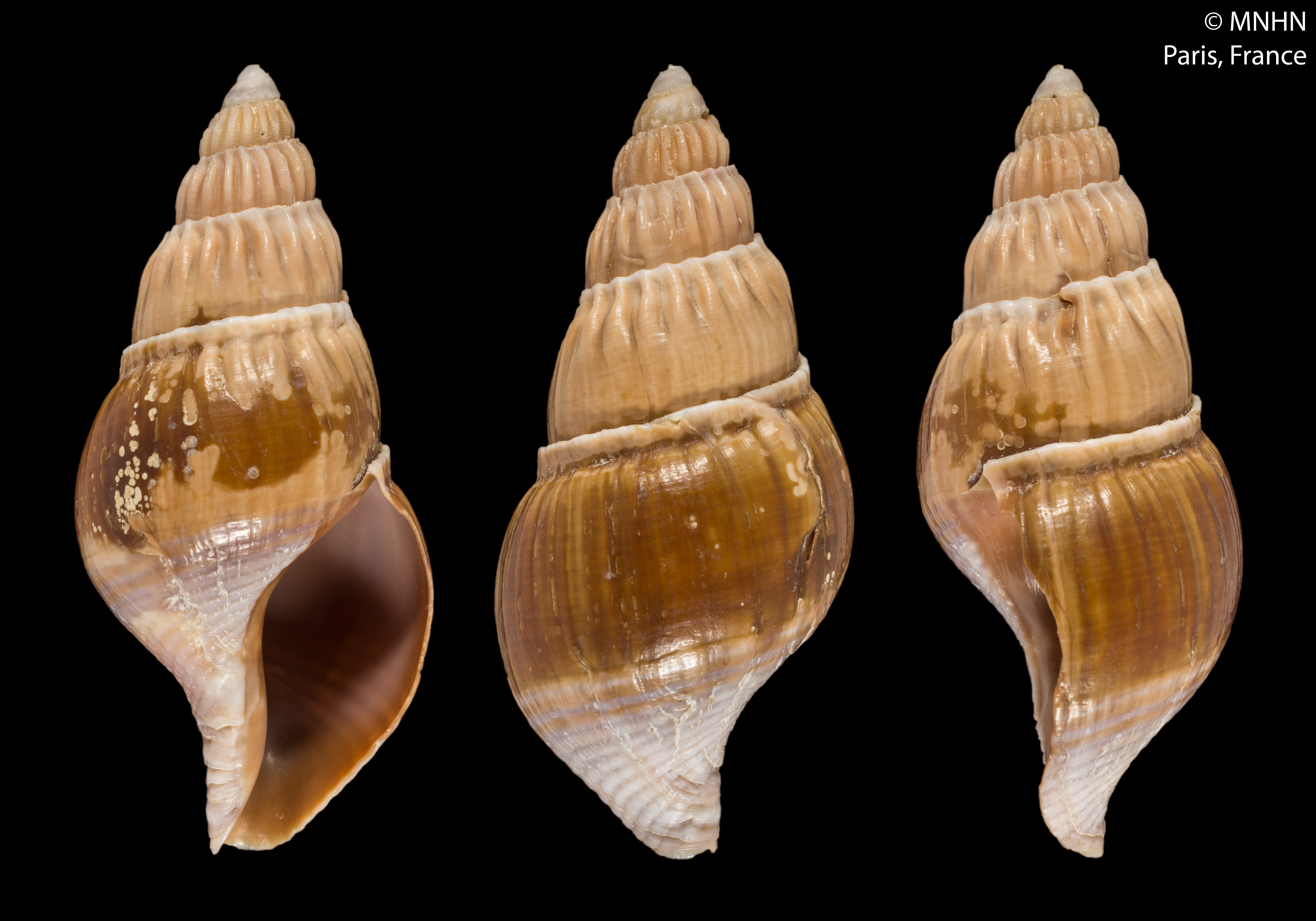
- Shell of Enigmaticolus monnieri (holotype at MNHN, Paris)

Scientific classification
- Kingdom: Animalia
- Phylum: Mollusca
- Class: Gastropoda
- Subclass: Caenogastropoda
- Order: Neogastropoda
- Family: Eosiphonidae
- Genus: Enigmaticolus; Fraussen, 2008

Type species
- Enigmaticolus monnieri Fraussen, 2008

= Enigmaticolus =

Genus of gastropods

Enigmaticolus is a genus of sea snails, marine gastropod molluscs in the family Eosiphonidae, the true whelks and their allies.

== Species ==
Species within the genus Enigmaticolus include:

- Enigmaticolus desbruyeresi (Okutani & Ohta, 1993)
- Enigmaticolus marshalli Fraussen & Stahlschmidt, 2016
- Enigmaticolus nipponensis (Okutani & Fujiwara, 2000)
- † Enigmaticolus semisulcatus (K. Martin, 1933)
- Enigmaticolus voluptarius Fraussen & Stahlschmidt, 2016

Synonyms

- Enigmaticolus auzendei (A. Warén & P. Bouchet, 2001): synonym of Thermosipho auzendei (A. Warén & P. Bouchet, 2001)
- Enigmaticolus inflatus S.-Q. Zhang, S.-P. Zhang & H. Chen, 2020: synonym of Enigmaticolus nipponensis (Okutani & Fujiwara, 2000)
- Enigmaticolus monnieri Fraussen, 2008: synonym of Enigmaticolus nipponensis (Okutani & Fujiwara, 2000)
