= Gaillea canetae =

Scientific classification
- Kingdom: Animalia
- Phylum: Mollusca
- Class: Gastropoda
- Subclass: Caenogastropoda
- Order: Neogastropoda
- Family: Eosiphonidae
- Genus: Gaillea
- Species: G. canetae

Binomial name
- Gaillea canetae (Clench & Aguayo, 1944)

Synonyms
- Buccinum canetae Clench & Aguayo, 1944 (original combination); Eosipho canetae (Clench & Aguayo, 1944); Manaria canetae (Clench & Aguayo, 1944); Metula canetae (Clench & Aguayo, 1944); Plicifusus jamarci Okutani, 1982

Species of gastropod

Gaillea canetae is a species of sea snail, a marine gastropod mollusc in the family Eosiphonidae, the true whelks and their allies.

== Distribution ==
A rare deepwater species.

Taken alive in fish traps set at 1,700 ft. depth (515 metres)

Offshore West coast BARBADOS, Lesser Antilles.
