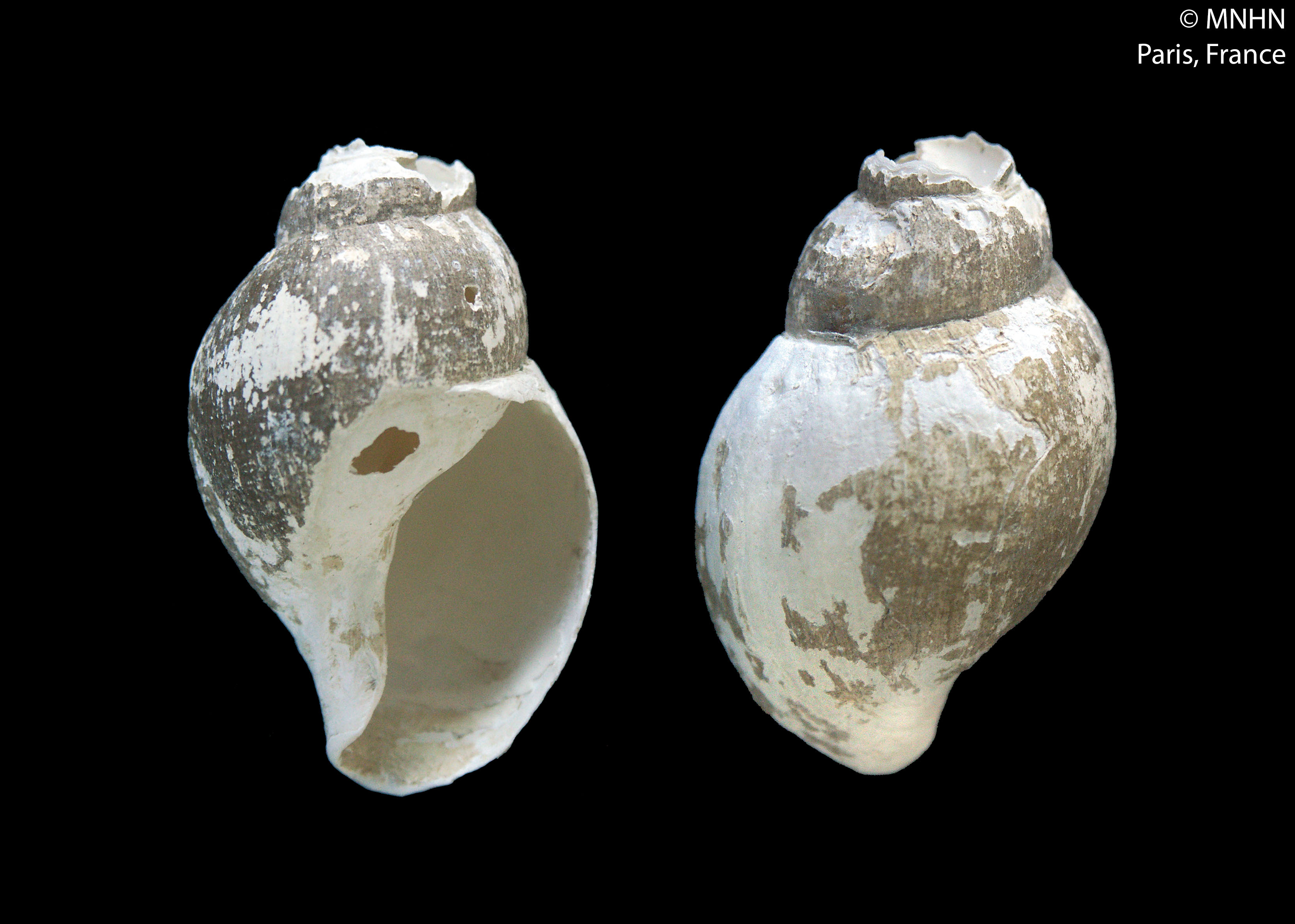
- Shell of Enigmaticolus desbruyeresi (specimen at MNHN, Paris)

Scientific classification
- Kingdom: Animalia
- Phylum: Mollusca
- Class: Gastropoda
- Subclass: Caenogastropoda
- Order: Neogastropoda
- Superfamily: Buccinoidea
- Family: Eosiphonidae; Kantor, Fedosov, Kosyan, Puillandre, Sorokin, Kano, R. Clark & Bouchet, 2021

Genera
- See text

= Eosiphonidae =

Family of sea snails

The Eosiphonidae are a taxonomic family of large sea snails, often known as whelks and the like.

== Genera ==
- Americominella Klappenbach & Ureta, 1972
- Calagrassor Kantor, Puillandre, Fraussen, Fedosov & Bouchet, 2013
- Eclectofusus Fraussen & Stahlschmidt, 2013
- Enigmaticolus Fraussen, 2008
- Eosipho Thiele, 1929
- Gaillea Kantor, Puillandre, Fraussen, Fedosov & Bouchet, 2013
- Manaria E. A. Smith, 1906
- Preangeria K. Martin, 1921
- Thermosipho Kantor, Puillandre, Fraussen, Fedosov & Bouchet, 2013
- Warenius Kantor, Kosyan, Sorokin, Herbert & Fedosov, 2020
