= Lamellilatirus ceramidus =

- Lamellilatirus ceramidus from the type locality

Scientific classification
- Kingdom: Animalia
- Phylum: Mollusca
- Class: Gastropoda
- Subclass: Caenogastropoda
- Order: Neogastropoda
- Family: Fasciolariidae
- Genus: Lamellilatirus
- Species: L. ceramidus

Binomial name
- Lamellilatirus ceramidus (Dall, 1889)

Synonyms
- Fusinus ceramidus (Dall, 1889); Fusus ceramidus Dall, 1889; Latirus ceramidus (Dall, 1889)

Species of gastropod

Lamellilatirus ceramidus is a species of sea snail, a marine gastropod mollusc in the family Fasciolariidae, the spindle snails, the tulip snails and their allies.

== Distribution ==
Type locality: Barbados, West Indies.

Dredged at depths around 150–200 metres.
