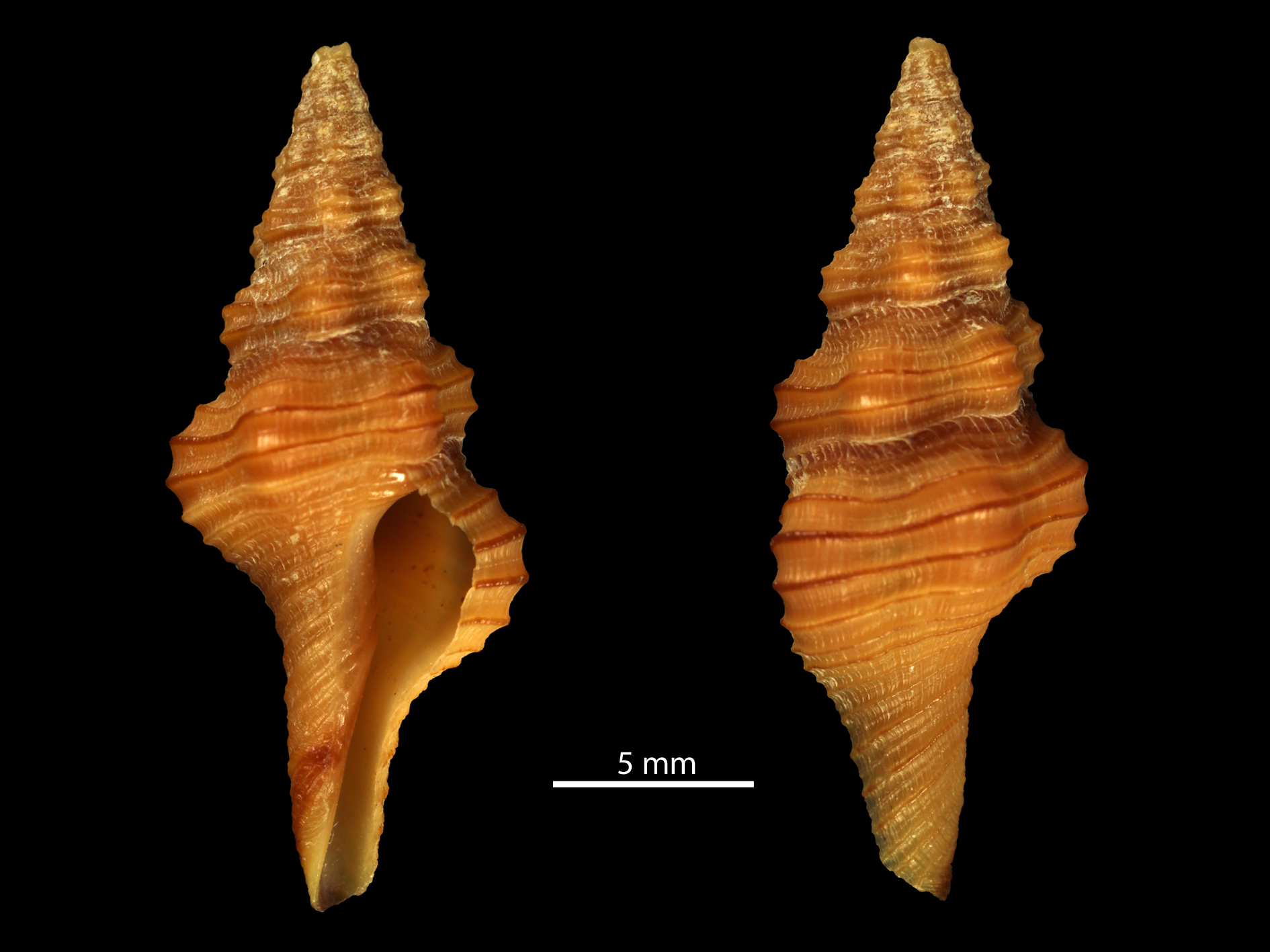
- Shell of Lamellilatirus dominiquei (paratype at MNHN, Paris)

Scientific classification
- Kingdom: Animalia
- Phylum: Mollusca
- Class: Gastropoda
- Subclass: Caenogastropoda
- Order: Neogastropoda
- Superfamily: Buccinoidea
- Family: Fasciolariidae
- Genus: Lamellilatirus; Lyons & Snyder, 2008

Type species
- Fusus ceramidus Dall, 1889

= Lamellilatirus =

Genus of gastropods

Lamellilatirus is a genus of small slug-like sea snails, marine gastropod molluscs in the subfamily Peristerniinae of the family Fasciolariidae.

== Species ==
- Lamellilatirus boucheti Lyons & Snyder, 2019
- Lamellilatirus ceramidus (Dall, 1889)
- Lamellilatirus corrugatus Lyons & Snyder, 2019
- Lamellilatirus dominiquei Lyons & Snyder, 2013
- Lamellilatirus eburneus Lyons & Snyder, 2013
- Lamellilatirus lamyi Lyons & Snyder, 2013
- Lamellilatirus sunderlandorum Lyons & Snyder, 2013
