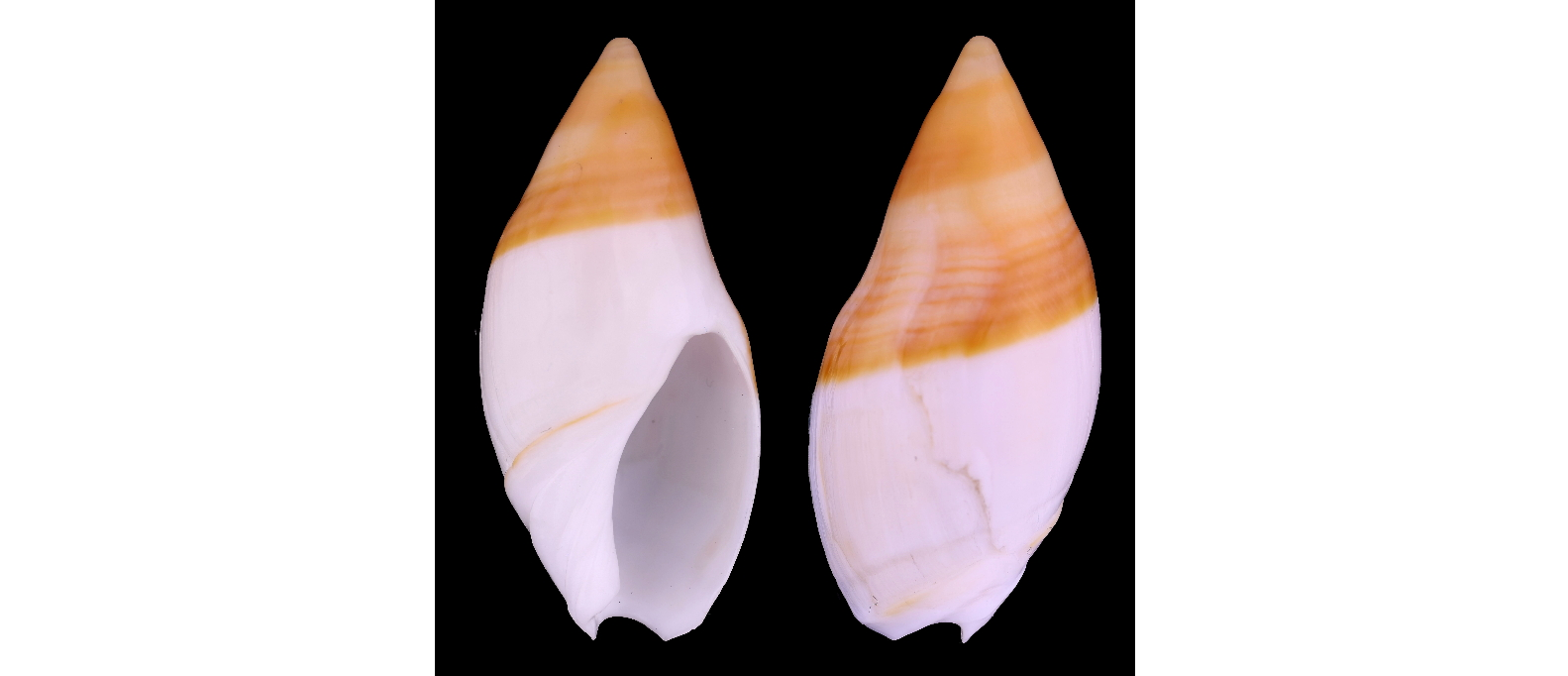
- Shell of Amalda mozambicana (holotype in the MNHN, Paris)

Scientific classification
- Kingdom: Animalia
- Phylum: Mollusca
- Class: Gastropoda
- Subclass: Caenogastropoda
- Order: Neogastropoda
- Family: Ancillariidae
- Genus: Amalda
- Species: A. mozambicana

Binomial name
- Amalda mozambicana Rosado & Monteiro, 2023

= Amalda mozambicana =

Species of gastropod

Amalda mozambicana is a species of sea snail, a marine gastropod mollusc in the family Ancillariidae, the olives.

== Distribution ==
This marine species occurs off Mozambique.
