= Amalda mirabelflorenti =

Scientific classification
- Kingdom: Animalia
- Phylum: Mollusca
- Class: Gastropoda
- Subclass: Caenogastropoda
- Order: Neogastropoda
- Family: Ancillariidae
- Genus: Amalda
- Species: A. mirabelflorenti

Binomial name
- Amalda mirabelflorenti T. Cossignani, 2018

Species of gastropod

Amalda mirabelflorenti is a species of sea snail, a marine gastropod mollusk in the family Ancillariidae.

== Distribution ==
This marine species occurs in off Vietnam.
