= Amalda trachyzonus =

Scientific classification
- Kingdom: Animalia
- Phylum: Mollusca
- Class: Gastropoda
- Subclass: Caenogastropoda
- Order: Neogastropoda
- Family: Ancillariidae
- Genus: Amalda
- Species: A. trachyzonus

Binomial name
- Amalda trachyzonus Kilburn, 1975

Synonyms
- Amalda (Baryspira) trachyzonus Kilburn, 1975 alternative representation (basionym)

Species of gastropod

Amalda trachyzonus is a species of sea snail, a marine gastropod mollusk in the family Ancillariidae.

== Description ==
The length of the shell attains 23.5 mm, its diameter 14.7 mm.

== Distribution ==
This marine species occurs off South Africa.
