= Amalda aureocallosa =

Scientific classification
- Kingdom: Animalia
- Phylum: Mollusca
- Class: Gastropoda
- Subclass: Caenogastropoda
- Order: Neogastropoda
- Family: Ancillariidae
- Genus: Amalda
- Species: A. aureocallosa

Binomial name
- Amalda aureocallosa Shikama & Oishi, 1977

Synonyms
- Baryspira utopica aureocallosa Shikama & Oishi, 1977 (original combination)

Species of gastropod

Amalda aureocallosa is a species of sea snail, a marine gastropod mollusk in the family Ancillariidae.

== Description ==
The length of the shell attains 40.3 mm, its diameter is 18.1 mm.

== Distribution ==
This species occurs in the East China Sea and off Japan.
