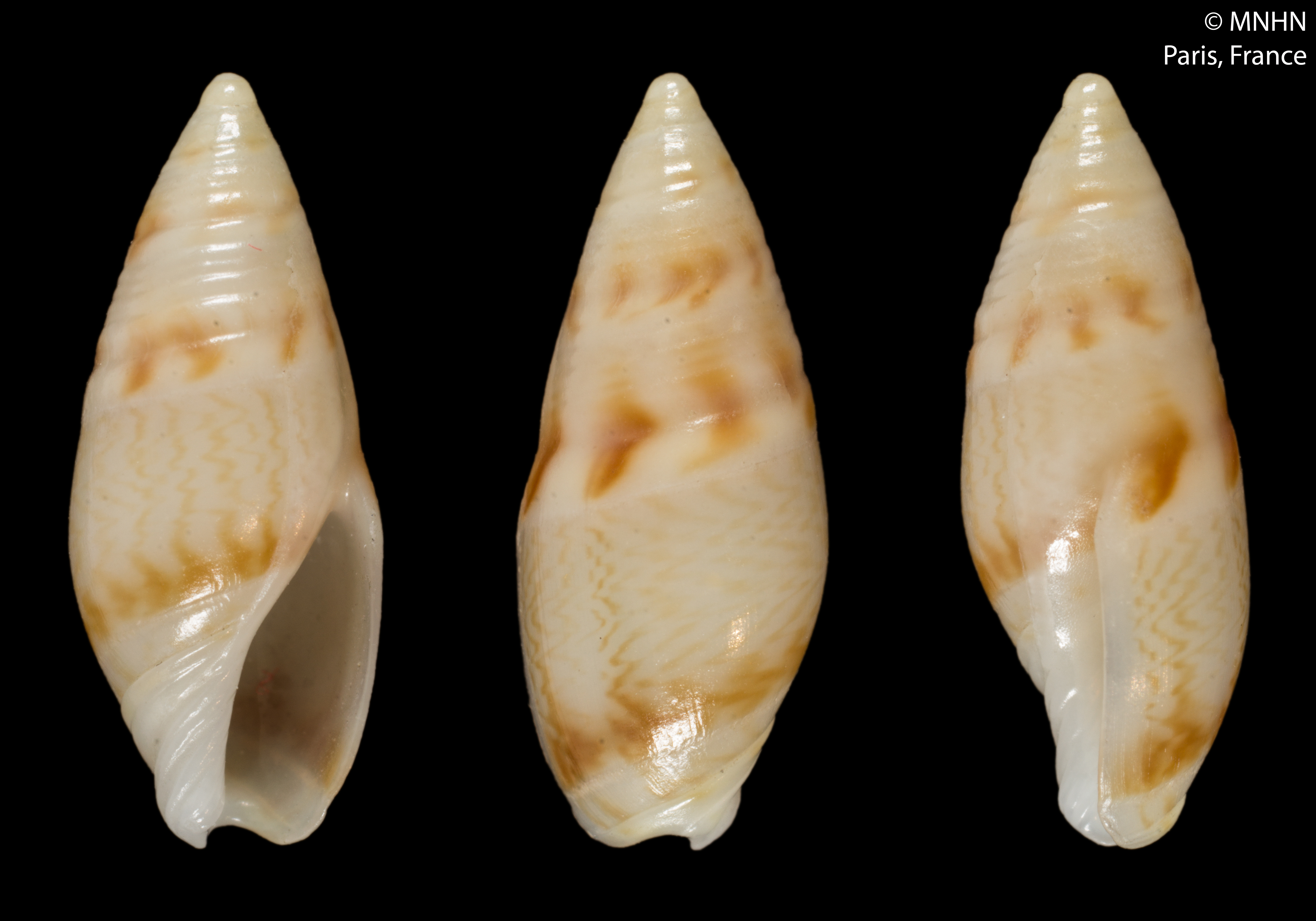

Scientific classification
- Kingdom: Animalia
- Phylum: Mollusca
- Class: Gastropoda
- Subclass: Caenogastropoda
- Order: Neogastropoda
- Family: Ancillariidae
- Genus: Amalda
- Species: A. edithae

Binomial name
- Amalda edithae (Pritchard & Gatliff, 1898)

Synonyms
- Alocospira edithae (Pritchard & Gatliff, 1899); Amalda (Exiquaspira) sydneyensis Ninomiya, 1991 alternative representation; Amalda sydneyensis Ninomiya, 1991 junior subjective synonym; Ancilla edithae Pritchard & Gatliff, 1899 (original combination)

= Amalda edithae =

Species of gastropod

Amalda edithae is a species of sea snail, a marine gastropod mollusk in the family Ancillariidae.

== Description ==
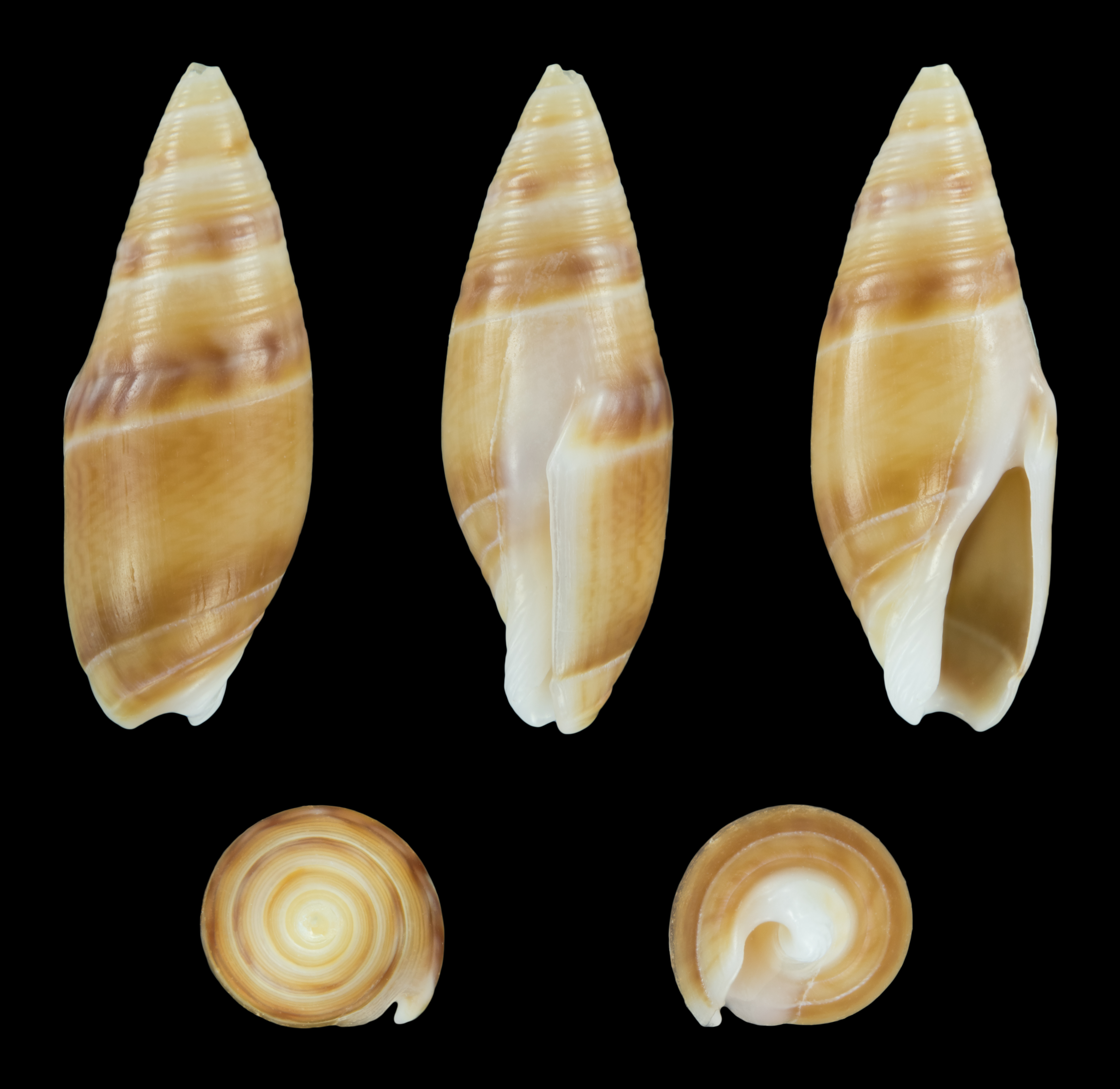
Dark form

The length of the shell attains 18 mm, its diameter 6 mm to 7 mm.

(Original description) The shell is elongate-fusiform, fairly solid, and consists of seven whorls, including two whorls in the protoconch. From the dorsal view, the body whorl makes up slightly more than half of the shell’s total length and is finely striated both longitudinally and spirally.

A columellar callosity extends from just below the center of the aperture across the body and penultimate whorls. This callosity is well-defined with a subtly corroded texture, but it does not protrude prominently. An enamel band originates below the suture of the body whorl and extends over the spire, though it becomes less prominent along the way. On the penultimate and body whorls, there are around five distinct, slightly punctate grooves encircling the shell.

The uppermost basal groove begins at the columellar callosity, just below the body whorl’s center, ending in a subtle projection of the outer lip. A second, similar groove follows after a brief interval, reaching just above the notch without any projection. This groove is succeeded by a well-defined ridge that curves slightly concavely at the lip due to the backward sweep of the notch. Next are about six ridges crossing the slightly twisted columella, with the topmost ridge ending at the notch’s center.

The aperture is narrow and lanceolate, with an acute outer lip that has a well-defined sinus at its juncture with the body whorl.

The shell is creamy white, featuring a brown band immediately above the upper basal groove. Occasionally, the coloration is continuous, though this band typically appears as a series of coalescing blotches. The enamel band is similarly colored with dashes that obliquely cross the suture, reverse direction, and continue around the spire. Between the bands on the body whorls are delicate, spirally zigzag, interrupted lines in a very light brown hue.

== Distribution ==
This marine species is endemic to Australia and occurs off New South Wales, South Australia, Victoria and Western Australia.
