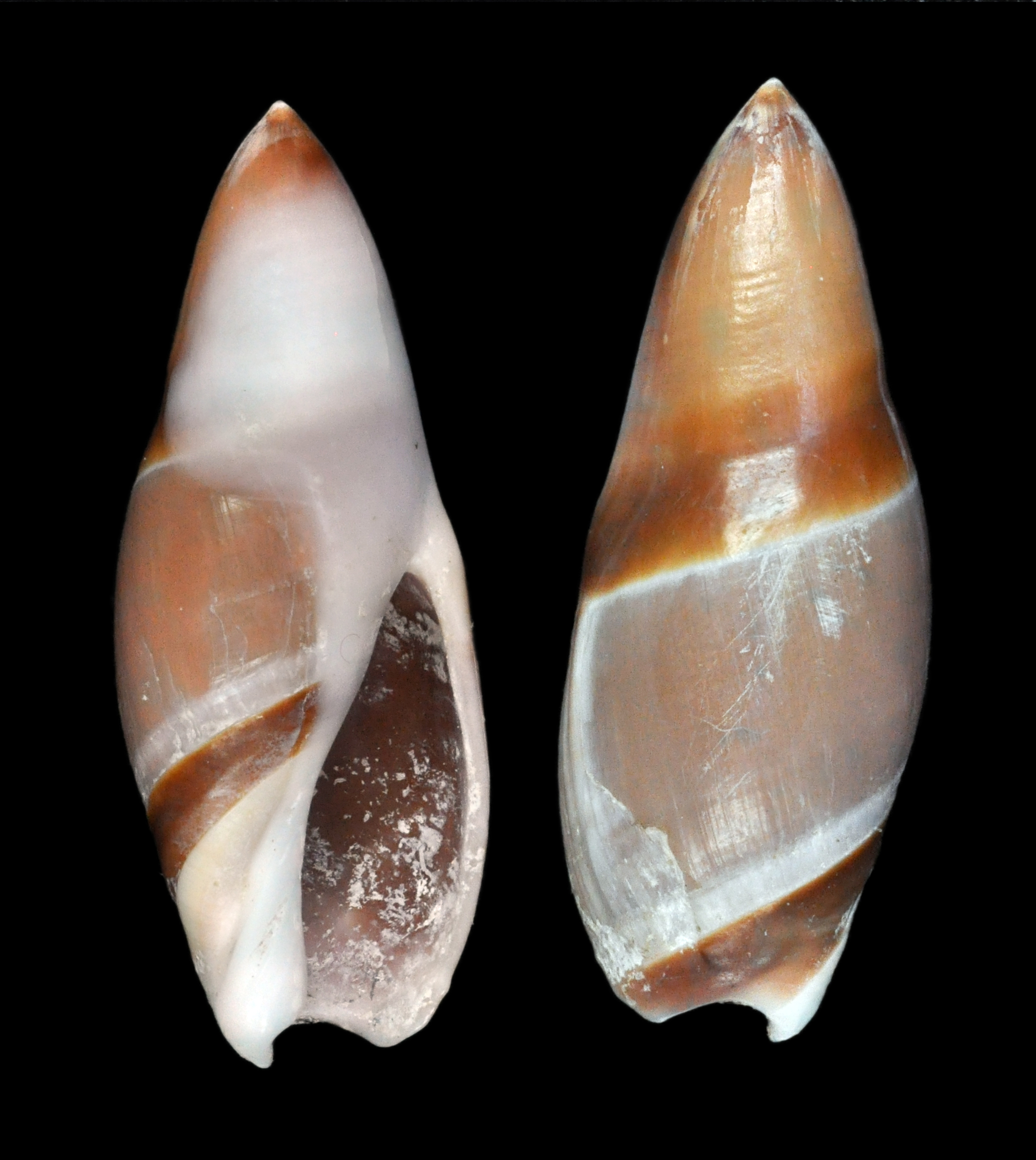
- Shell of Amalda hinomotoensis (specimen at MNHN, Paris)

Scientific classification
- Kingdom: Animalia
- Phylum: Mollusca
- Class: Gastropoda
- Subclass: Caenogastropoda
- Order: Neogastropoda
- Family: Ancillariidae
- Genus: Amalda
- Species: A. hinomotoensis

Binomial name
- Amalda hinomotoensis (Yokoyama, 1922)

Synonyms
- Amalda urasima Okutani 2000; † Ancilla hinomotoensis Yokoyama, 1922 superseded combination; Baryspira urasimaKira, 1959 (unavailable name: no description)

= Amalda hinomotoensis =

Species of gastropod

Amalda hinomotoensis is a species of sea snail, a marine gastropod mollusk in the family Ancillariidae, the olives.

== Description ==
The length of the shell attains 41 mm.

The shell is narrow to ovate-fusiform, with a weakly cyrtoconoid spire. The primary spire callus is thick and micro-shagreened, covering all whorls except the tip of the protoconch, making accurate measurements impossible. The secondary callus is thick, strongly micro-shagreened, and matte, merging seamlessly with the parietal callus without a visible border, and nearly reaching the tip of the shell.

The plication plate has up to five ridges separated by grooves, or it may be nearly smooth, while the columella is smooth. The olivoid groove is shallow to very shallow, and the denticle of the outer lip is very short and obtuse. The anterior band is strongly micro-shagreened, with the upper anterior band being very weakly convex and the lower anterior band flat.

The primary callus is orange-brown in the middle, lighter toward the abapical end, and bordered by a very thin, light spiral line. The secondary callus is white. The body whorl cloak is light chestnut, the olivoid band is whitish, the upper anterior band is dark brown, the lower anterior band is creamy, and the plication plate is white.

== Distribution ==
The marine species occurs off Japan. Fossils of the lectotype ware found in Pliocene strata of Shito, Japan.
