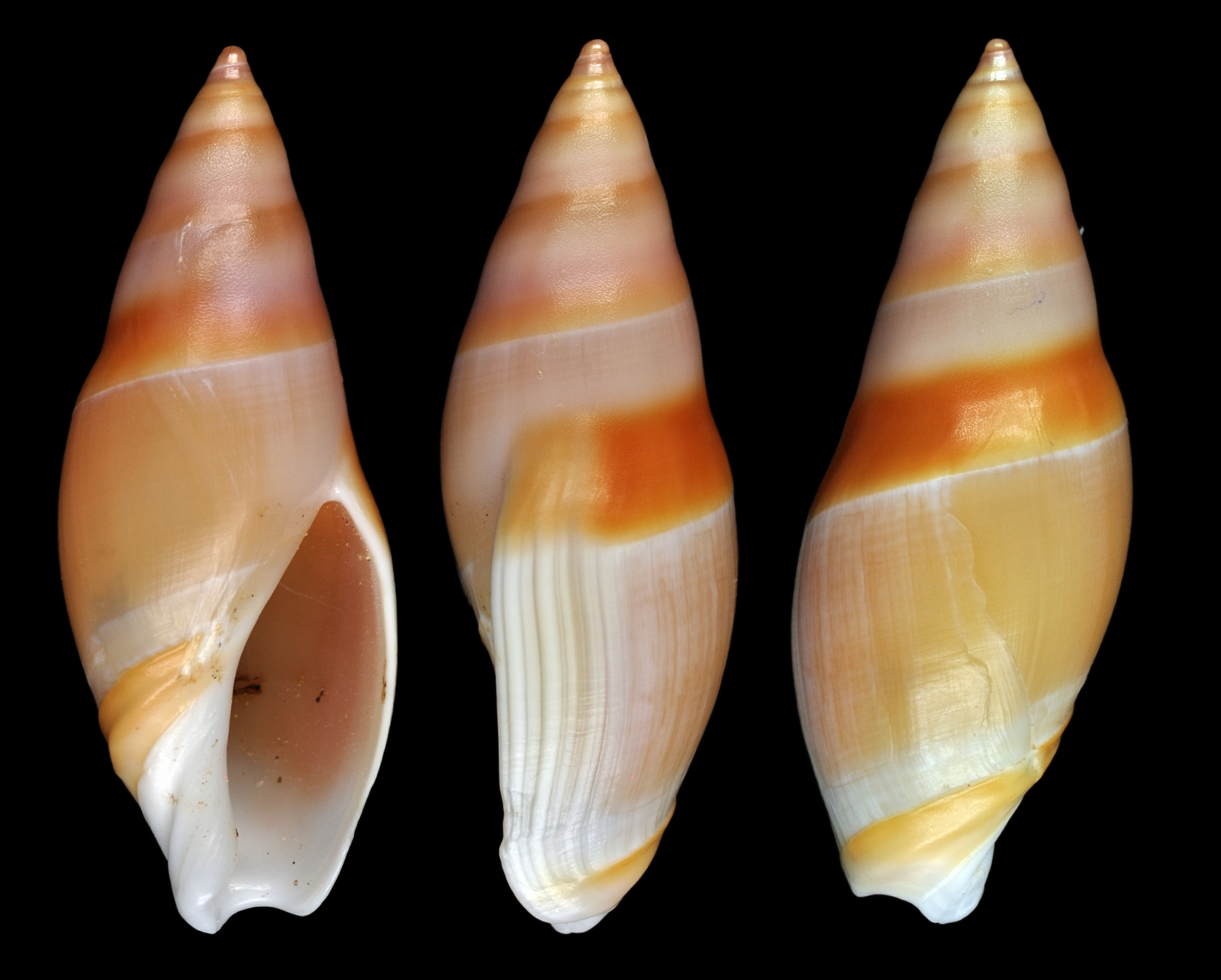
- Shell of Amalda miriky (specimen at MNHN, Paris)

Scientific classification
- Kingdom: Animalia
- Phylum: Mollusca
- Class: Gastropoda
- Subclass: Caenogastropoda
- Order: Neogastropoda
- Family: Ancillariidae
- Genus: Amalda
- Species: A. miriky

Binomial name
- Amalda miriky Kantor, Castelin, Fedosov & Bouchet, 2020

= Amalda miriky =

Species of gastropod

Amalda miriky is a species of sea snail, a marine gastropod mollusk in the family Ancillariidae.

== Description ==
The length of the shell attains 53 mm

The shell is fusiform with a large, dome-shaped protoconch, the first whorl having a diameter of approximately 1.25 mm. Both the primary and secondary calluses are densely and distinctly micro-shagreened. The olivoid groove is very shallow and barely noticeable. The anterior band is divided by a prominent fasciolar ridge into an upper and a lower band, with the upper band being twice as wide as the lower.

The upper anterior band features a distinct ridge, rounded at the top. The body whorl varies in color from light yellow to light orange, while the olivoid band is pale. The upper anterior band is orange-brown, and the lower anterior band and plication plate are white. The primary callus is orange-brown, and the spire whorls exhibit a slight bluish tint. The protoconch shares the same color as the primary callus.

== Distribution ==
This marine species occurs in the Madagascan part of the Mozambique Channel
