= Amalda turgida =

Scientific classification
- Kingdom: Animalia
- Phylum: Mollusca
- Class: Gastropoda
- Subclass: Caenogastropoda
- Order: Neogastropoda
- Family: Ancillariidae
- Genus: Amalda
- Species: A. turgida

Binomial name
- Amalda turgida Ninomiya, 1990

Species of gastropod

Amalda turgida is a species of sea snail, a marine gastropod mollusk in the family Ancillariidae.

== Distribution ==
The distribution of this species is only known from the type locality, which is off Esperanee, south Western Australia.
