= Amalda telaaraneae =

Scientific classification
- Kingdom: Animalia
- Phylum: Mollusca
- Class: Gastropoda
- Subclass: Caenogastropoda
- Order: Neogastropoda
- Family: Ancillariidae
- Genus: Amalda
- Species: A. telaaraneae

Binomial name
- Amalda telaaraneae Kilburn, 1993

Species of gastropod

Amalda telaaraneae is a species of sea snail, a marine gastropod mollusk in the family Ancillariidae.

== Description ==
The length of the shell ranges from 11.5 – 14.2 mm, with a diameter of 5.2 – 6.9 mm. The opening of the shell is approximately 1.65 mm wide. The color is described as yellowish-brown, with faint brown lines across the shell.

== Distribution ==
This marine species occurs in the waters of the continental shelf off the southeastern coast of South Africa.
