= Amalda venezuela =

Scientific classification
- Kingdom: Animalia
- Phylum: Mollusca
- Class: Gastropoda
- Subclass: Caenogastropoda
- Order: Neogastropoda
- Family: Ancillariidae
- Genus: Amalda
- Species: A. venezuela

Binomial name
- Amalda venezuela Weisbord, 1962

Species of gastropod

Amalda venezuela is a species of sea snail, a marine gastropod mollusk in the family Ancillariidae.

== Description ==
The length of the shell attains 30.3 mm, its diameter is 13.5 mm.

== Distribution ==
This marine species occurs off Venezuela.
