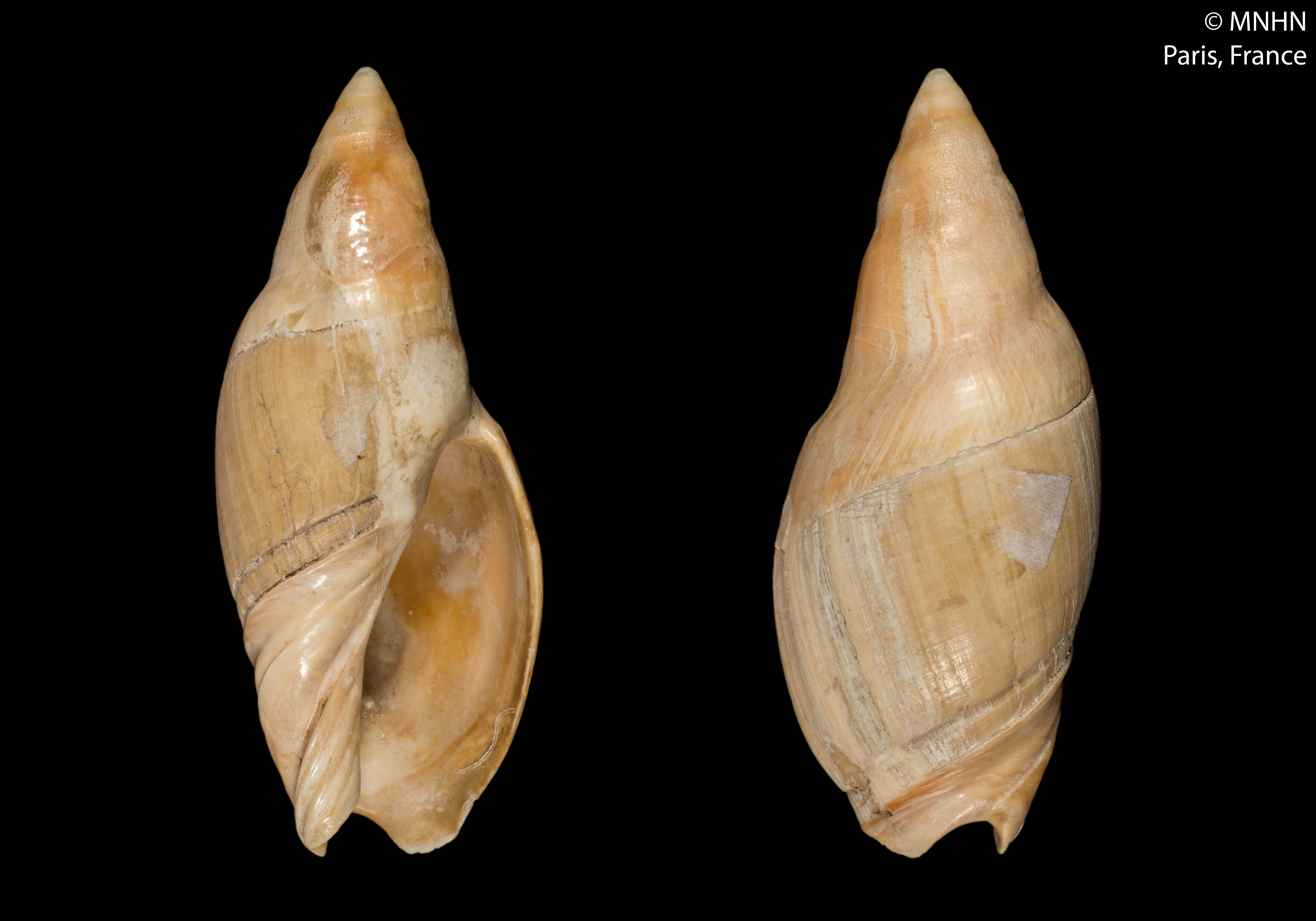
- Shell of Amalda harasewychi (holotype at MNHN, Paris)

Scientific classification
- Kingdom: Animalia
- Phylum: Mollusca
- Class: Gastropoda
- Subclass: Caenogastropoda
- Order: Neogastropoda
- Family: Ancillariidae
- Genus: Amalda
- Species: A. harasewychi

Binomial name
- Amalda harasewychi Thach, 2016

= Amalda harasewychi =

Species of gastropod

Amalda harasewychi is a species of sea snail, a marine gastropod mollusk in the family Ancillariidae, the olives.

== Distribution ==
The marine species occurs off Vietnam
