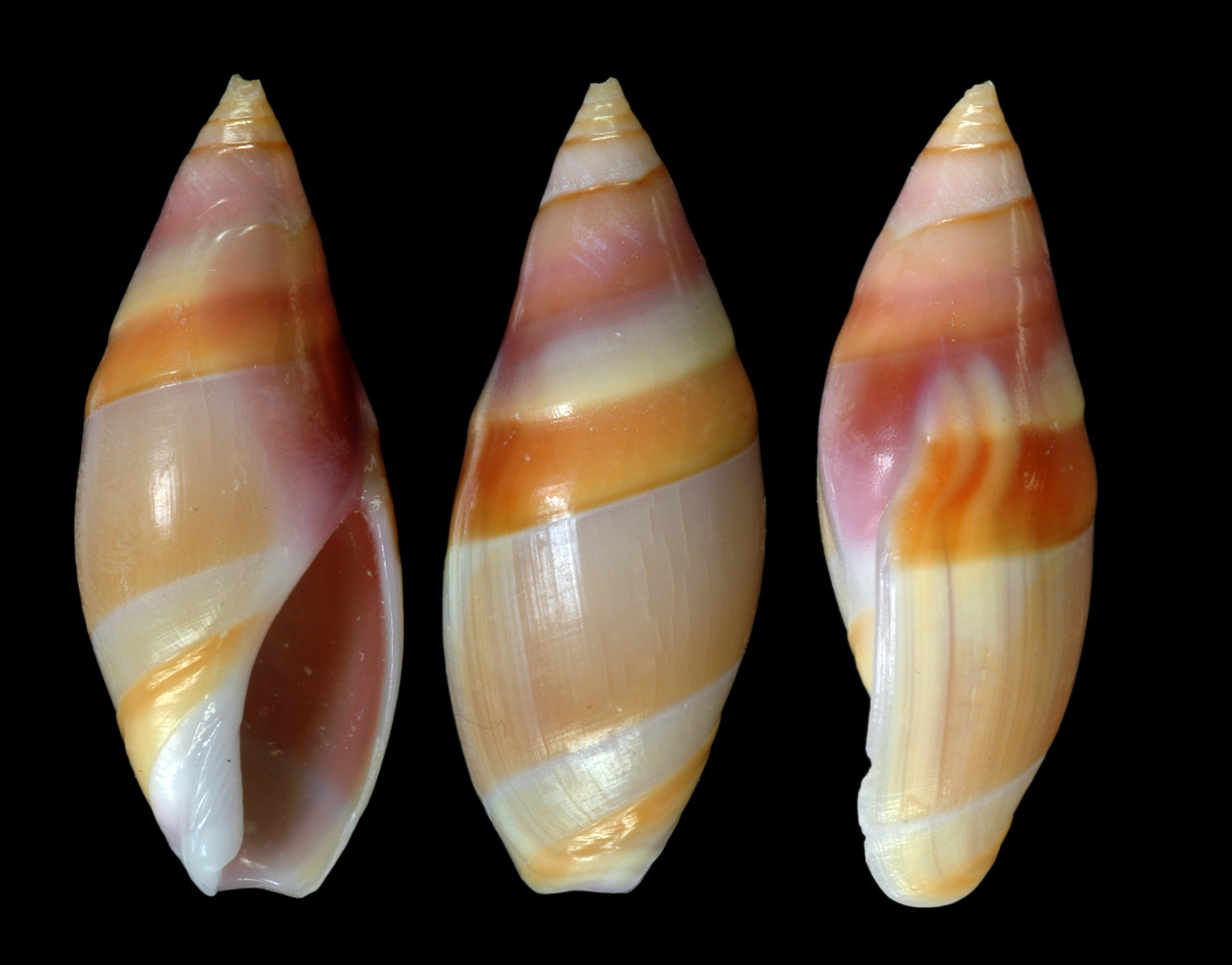
- Shell of Amalda aureomarginata (specimen at MNHN, Paris)

Scientific classification
- Kingdom: Animalia
- Phylum: Mollusca
- Class: Gastropoda
- Subclass: Caenogastropoda
- Order: Neogastropoda
- Family: Ancillariidae
- Genus: Amalda
- Species: A. aureomarginata

Binomial name
- Amalda aureomarginata Kilburn & Bouchet, 1988

= Amalda aureomarginata =

Species of gastropod

Amalda aureomarginata is a species of sea snail, a marine gastropod mollusk in the family Ancillariidae.

== Description ==
The length of the shell attains 34.5 mm

The shell is relatively narrow and ovate-fusiform, with a narrow base and a high, sharply conical spire. The diameter of the first protoconch whorl measures between 0.88 and 0.94 mm (mean 0.91, n = 5). The primary spire callus is thick, covering all but the protoconch and one or two teleoconch whorls. A secondary callus forms a fairly thin, tongue-shaped pad that extends to the penultimate suture. The plication plate has 4–7 ridges, which may sometimes be bifid. The olivoid groove is relatively shallow, and the denticle of the outer lip is very weak.

The upper anterior band is weakly convex, nearly flat, and may be slightly thickened at the rear edge. The lower anterior band is flat and smooth. The shell's color is a light yellowish-brown with a paler olivoid band. The spire callus displays an orange-yellow lower band, bordered by a narrow light line below and a creamy upper band with a purple tint. The primary callus has a distinct brown border at the top. The parietal callus is thick and typically purplish-pink. The upper anterior band is yellowish-orange, while the lower anterior band and plication plate are white.

== Distribution ==
This marine species occurs off New Caledonia.
