= Amalda procera =

Scientific classification
- Kingdom: Animalia
- Phylum: Mollusca
- Class: Gastropoda
- Subclass: Caenogastropoda
- Order: Neogastropoda
- Family: Ancillariidae
- Genus: Amalda
- Species: A. procera

Binomial name
- Amalda procera Ninomiya, 1991

Synonyms
- Amalda (Gracilispira) procerum Ninomiya, 1991 (original combination; incorrect gender ending)

Species of gastropod

Amalda procera is a species of sea snail, a marine gastropod mollusk in the family Ancillariidae.

== Distribution ==
This marine species occurs off Australia.
