= Amalda colmani =

Scientific classification
- Kingdom: Animalia
- Phylum: Mollusca
- Class: Gastropoda
- Subclass: Caenogastropoda
- Order: Neogastropoda
- Family: Ancillariidae
- Genus: Amalda
- Species: A. colmani

Binomial name
- Amalda colmani Ninomiya, 1991

Synonyms
- Amalda (Alocospira) colmani Ninomiya, T. 1991

Species of gastropod

Amalda colmani is a species of sea snail, a marine gastropod mollusk in the family Ancillariidae.

== Taxonomy ==
Status uncertain.

== Distribution ==
This marine species is endemic to Queensland, Australia.
