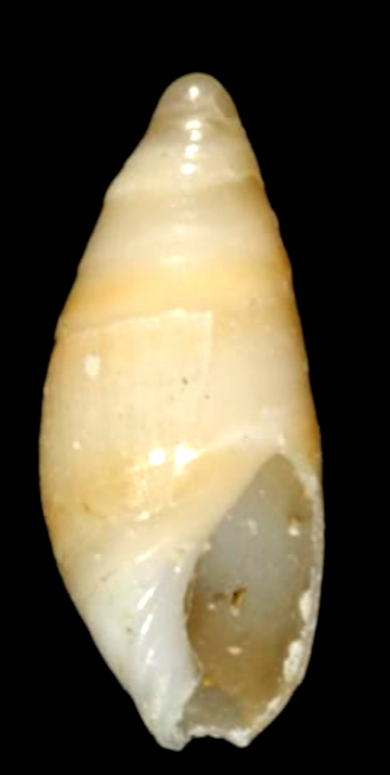
- Shell of Amalda fasciata (holotype at the Australian Museum)

Scientific classification
- Kingdom: Animalia
- Phylum: Mollusca
- Class: Gastropoda
- Subclass: Caenogastropoda
- Order: Neogastropoda
- Family: Ancillariidae
- Genus: Amalda
- Species: A. fasciata

Binomial name
- Amalda fasciata Ninomiya, 1991

Synonyms
- Amalda (Alocospira) fasciata Ninomiya, 1991

= Amalda fasciata =

Species of gastropod

Amalda fasciata is a species of sea snail, a marine gastropod mollusk in the family Ancillariidae.

== Distribution ==
This marine species is endemic to Australia and occurs off New South Wales.
