= Amalda lindae =

Scientific classification
- Kingdom: Animalia
- Phylum: Mollusca
- Class: Gastropoda
- Subclass: Caenogastropoda
- Order: Neogastropoda
- Family: Ancillariidae
- Genus: Amalda
- Species: A. lindae

Binomial name
- Amalda lindae Kilburn, 1993

Species of gastropod

Amalda lindae is a species of sea snail, a marine gastropod mollusk in the family Ancillariidae.

== Description ==
The length of the shell attains 35.2 mm, its diameter 11.9 mm.

== Distribution ==
This marine species occurs off the Eastern Cape, South Africa.
