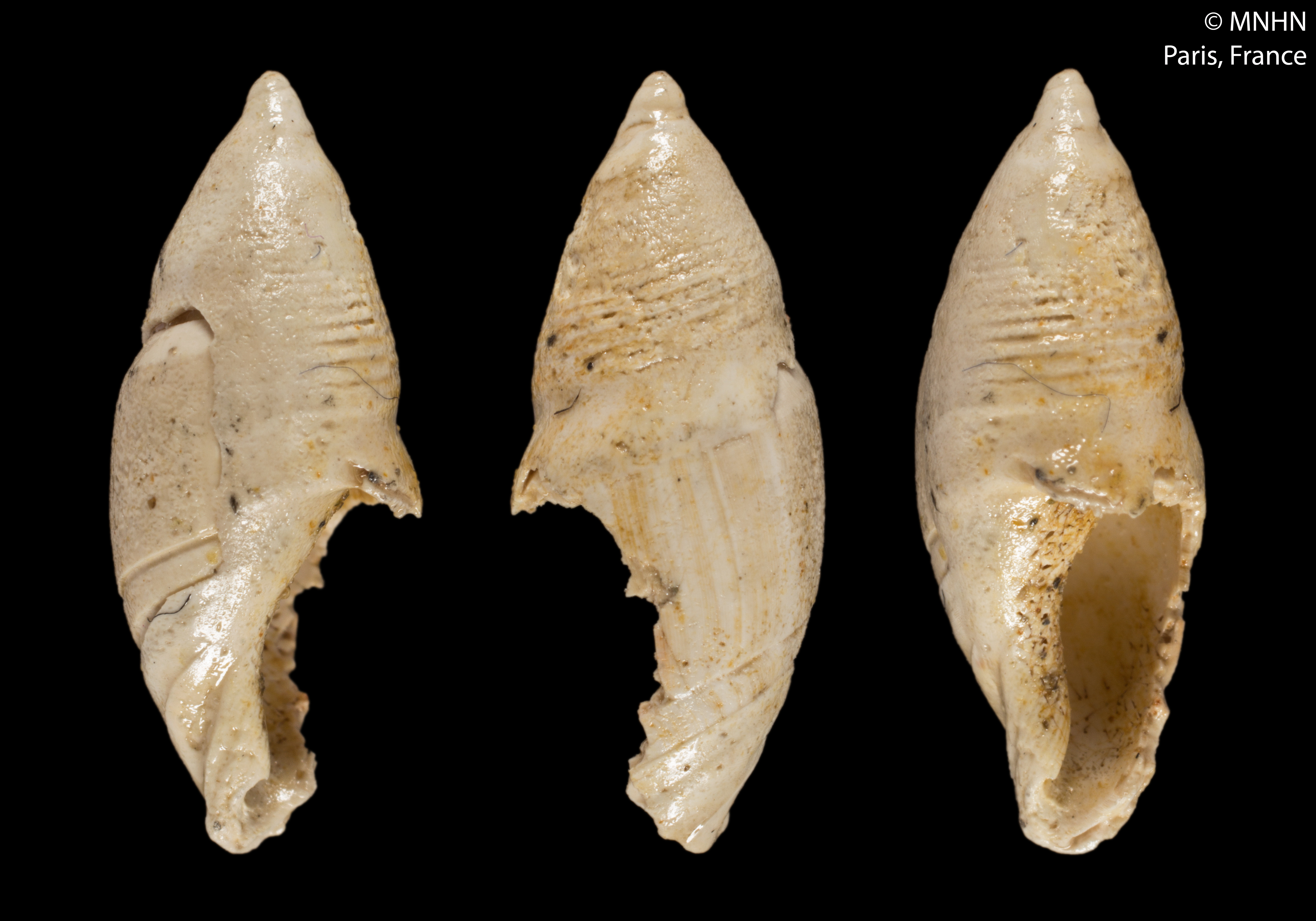
- Shell of Amalda abessensis (holotype at MNHN, Paris)

Scientific classification
- Kingdom: Animalia
- Phylum: Mollusca
- Class: Gastropoda
- Subclass: Caenogastropoda
- Order: Neogastropoda
- Family: Ancillariidae
- Genus: Amalda
- Species: †A. abessensis

Binomial name
- †Amalda abessensis Lozouet, 1992

Synonyms
- † Amalda (Alocospira) abessensis Lozouet, 1992 alternative representation

= Amalda abessensis =

Species of gastropod

Amalda abessensis is an extinct species of sea snail, a marine gastropod mollusk in the family Ancillariidae.

== Distribution ==
Fossils of this marine species were found in the Landes, Southwest France.
