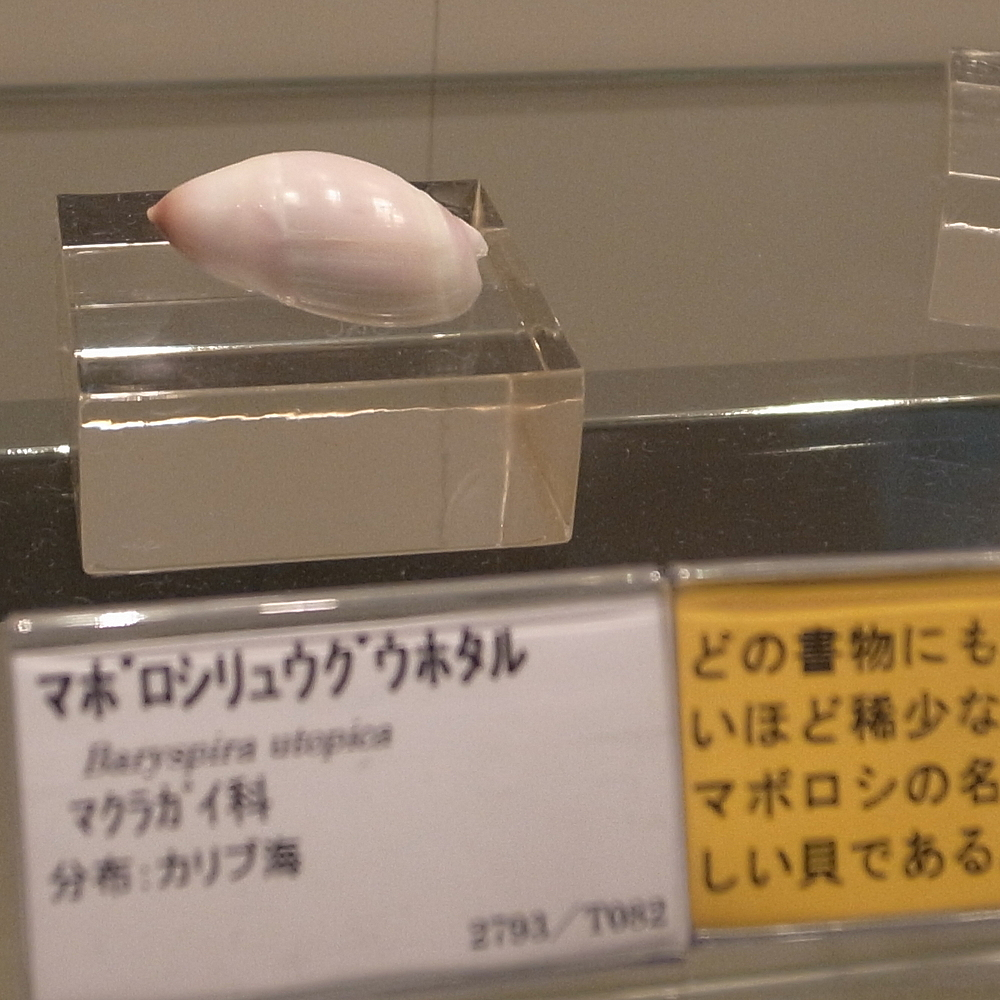

Scientific classification
- Kingdom: Animalia
- Phylum: Mollusca
- Class: Gastropoda
- Subclass: Caenogastropoda
- Order: Neogastropoda
- Family: Ancillariidae
- Genus: Amalda
- Species: A. utopica

Binomial name
- Amalda utopica Ninomiya, 1987

Synonyms
- Baryspira utopica Kuroda MS

= Amalda utopica =

Species of gastropod

Amalda utopica is a species of sea snail, a marine gastropod mollusc in the family Ancillariidae.

== Description ==
The length of the shell attains 45 mm.

== Distribution ==
This marine species occurs off Japan.
