= Amalda borshengi =

Scientific classification
- Kingdom: Animalia
- Phylum: Mollusca
- Class: Gastropoda
- Subclass: Caenogastropoda
- Order: Neogastropoda
- Family: Ancillariidae
- Genus: Amalda
- Species: A. borshengi

Binomial name
- Amalda borshengi Lan & Lee, 2002

Species of gastropod

Amalda borshengi is a species of sea snail, a marine gastropod mollusc in the family Ancillariidae, the olives.

== Distribution ==
This marine species occurs off Taiwan.
