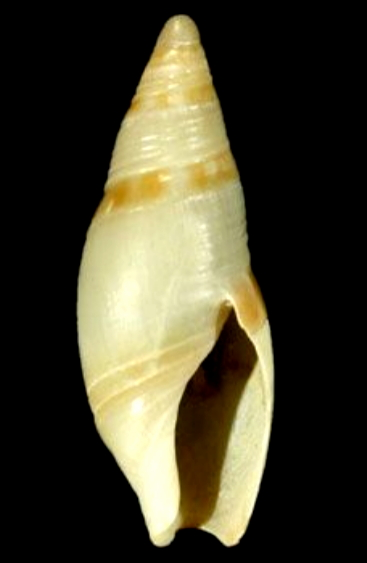
- Shell of Amalda rubrofasciata (specimen at the Natural History Museum, Rotterdam)

Scientific classification
- Kingdom: Animalia
- Phylum: Mollusca
- Class: Gastropoda
- Subclass: Caenogastropoda
- Order: Neogastropoda
- Family: Ancillariidae
- Genus: Amalda
- Species: A. rubrofasciata

Binomial name
- Amalda rubrofasciata Ninomiya, 1991

Synonyms
- Alocospira rubrofasciata (Ninomiya, 1991); Amalda (Alocospira) rubrofasciata Ninomiya, T. 1991

= Amalda rubrofasciata =

Species of gastropod

Amalda rubrofasciata is a species of sea snail, a marine gastropod mollusk in the family Ancillariidae.

== Taxonomy ==
Status uncertain.

== Description ==
The length of the shell attains 16 mm.

== Distribution ==
This marine species is endemic to Australia and occurs off New South Wales.
