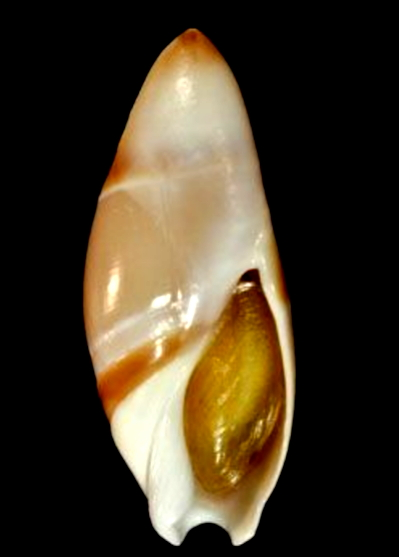
- Shell of Amalda otohime (specimen at the Natural History Museum, Rotterdam)

Scientific classification
- Kingdom: Animalia
- Phylum: Mollusca
- Class: Gastropoda
- Subclass: Caenogastropoda
- Order: Neogastropoda
- Family: Ancillariidae
- Genus: Amalda
- Species: A. otohime

Binomial name
- Amalda otohime Majima, Tsuchida & Oshima, 1993

= Amalda otohime =

Species of gastropod

Amalda otohime is a species of sea snail, a marine gastropod mollusk in the family Ancillariidae.

== Description ==
The length of the shell attains 25 mm.

== Distribution ==
This marine species occurs off Japan.
