= Amalda gabelishi =

Scientific classification
- Kingdom: Animalia
- Phylum: Mollusca
- Class: Gastropoda
- Subclass: Caenogastropoda
- Order: Neogastropoda
- Family: Ancillariidae
- Genus: Amalda
- Species: A. gabelishi

Binomial name
- Amalda gabelishi Ninomiya, 1988

Synonyms
- Amalda (Exiquaspira) gabelishi Ninomiya, 1988 ·

Species of gastropod

Amalda gabelishi is a species of sea snail, a marine gastropod mollusk in the family Ancillariidae, the olives.

== Description ==
The length of the shell attains 35.7 mm, its diameter 16.8 mm.

== Distribution ==
The marine species occurs off Esperance Bay, Western Australia.
