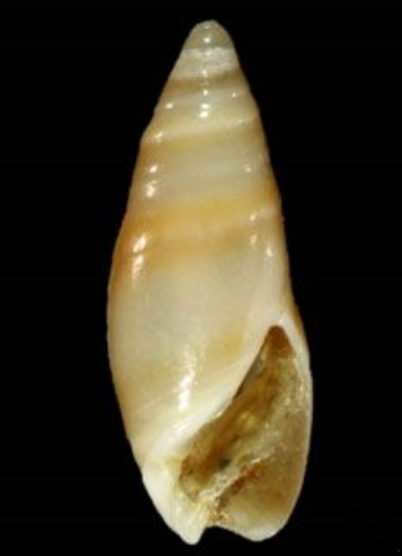
- Shell of Amalda pullarium (specimen at the Natural History Museum, Rotterdam)

Scientific classification
- Kingdom: Animalia
- Phylum: Mollusca
- Class: Gastropoda
- Subclass: Caenogastropoda
- Order: Neogastropoda
- Family: Ancillariidae
- Genus: Amalda
- Species: A. pullarium

Binomial name
- Amalda pullarium Ninomiya, 1991

Synonyms
- Alocospira pullarium (Ninomiya, 1991); Amalda (Alocospira) pullarium Ninomiya, T. 1991

= Amalda pullarium =

Species of gastropod

Amalda pullarium is a species of sea snail, a marine gastropod mollusk in the family Ancillariidae.

== Description ==
The length of the shell attains 7.5 mm.

== Distribution ==
This marine species is endemic to Australia and occurs off Queensland.
