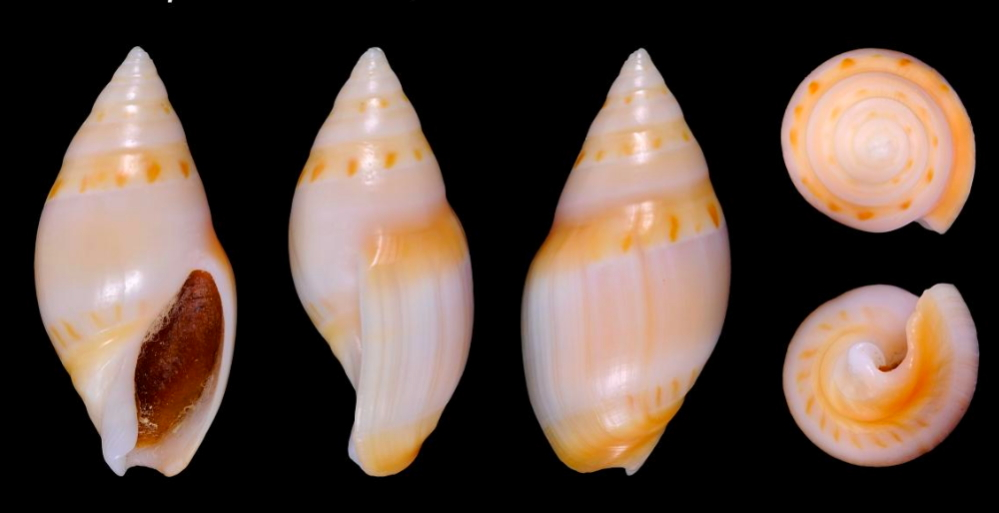
- Shell of Amalda pacei (holotype at the Smithsonian Institution)

Scientific classification
- Kingdom: Animalia
- Phylum: Mollusca
- Class: Gastropoda
- Subclass: Caenogastropoda
- Order: Neogastropoda
- Family: Ancillariidae
- Genus: Amalda
- Species: A. pacei

Binomial name
- Amalda pacei Petuch, 1987

Synonyms
- Amalda zeigleri Ninomiya, 1987

= Amalda pacei =

Species of gastropod

Amalda pacei is a species of sea snail, a marine gastropod mollusk in the family Ancillariidae.

== Description ==
Original description: "Shell stocky, heavy, fusiform in shape; spire elevated; main section of body whorl with silky texture; suture bounded by wide band of enamel along shoulder region; spire whorls comprising two distinct zones, lower one with same silky texture of main body whorl, upper one with shiny enameled texture; fascicular band well-developed, surrounding anterior end of shell; shell color pale salmon-orange on main section of body whorl and lower zone of spire; enameled sub-sutural shoulder and fascicular bands bright orange, marked with evenly-spaced, dark orange-brown flammules; columella white, with one large twisted plication; interior of aperture pale salmon-orange; protoconch pale salmon in color, rounded, dome-shaped; operculum large, oval, dark tan in color."

== Distribution ==
Locus typicus: "Off the Northern coast of Roatan Island, Honduras."; also off Nicaragua and Jamaica.
