= Amalda aureus =

Scientific classification
- Kingdom: Animalia
- Phylum: Mollusca
- Class: Gastropoda
- Subclass: Caenogastropoda
- Order: Neogastropoda
- Family: Ancillariidae
- Genus: Amalda
- Species: A. aureus

Binomial name
- Amalda aureus Ninomiya, 1990

Synonyms
- Alocospira aureus (Ninomiya, 1990); Amalda (Alocospira) aureus Ninomiya, T. 1990

Species of gastropod

Amalda aureus is a species of sea snail, a marine gastropod mollusk in the family Ancillariidae.

== Taxonomy ==
Status uncertain.

== Distribution ==
This marine species is endemic to Australia and occurs off Western Australia.
