= Amalda albanyensis =

Scientific classification
- Kingdom: Animalia
- Phylum: Mollusca
- Class: Gastropoda
- Subclass: Caenogastropoda
- Order: Neogastropoda
- Family: Ancillariidae
- Genus: Amalda
- Species: A. albanyensis

Binomial name
- Amalda albanyensis Ninomiya, 1987

Species of mollusk

Amalda albanyensis is a species of sea snail, a marine gastropod mollusk in the family Ancillariidae.
