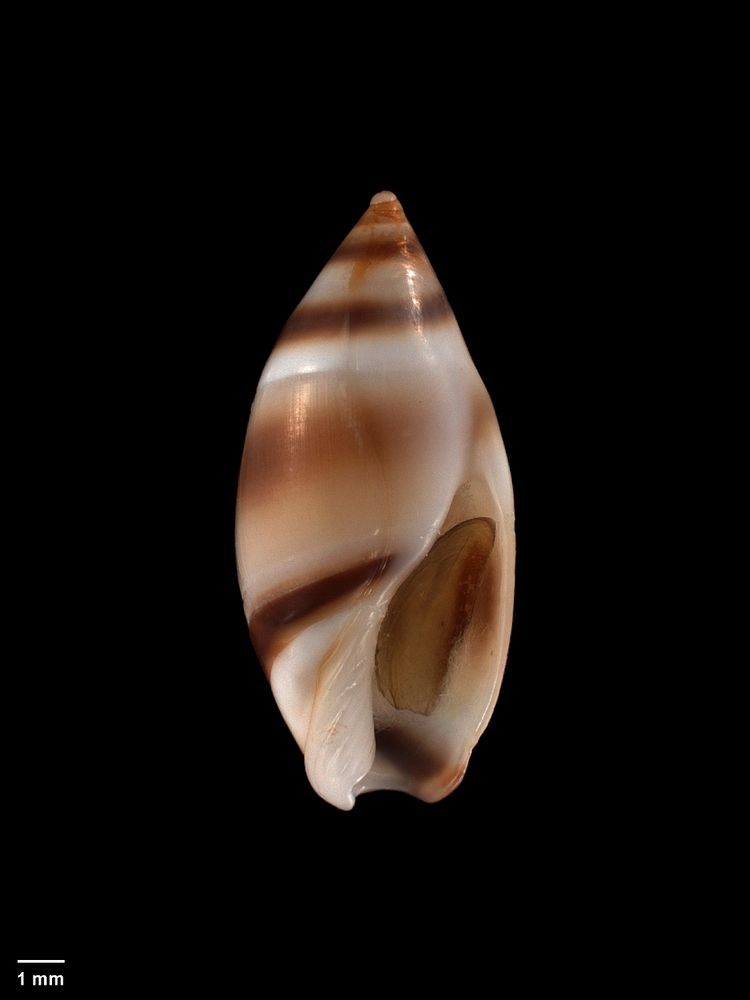
- Shell of Amalda northlandica (specimen in the Museum of New Zealand)

Scientific classification
- Kingdom: Animalia
- Phylum: Mollusca
- Class: Gastropoda
- Subclass: Caenogastropoda
- Order: Neogastropoda
- Family: Ancillariidae
- Genus: Amalda
- Species: A. northlandica

Binomial name
- Amalda northlandica Hart, 1995

Synonyms
- Amalda (Gracilispira) northlandica Hart, 1995 superseded combination

= Amalda northlandica =

Species of gastropod

Amalda northlandica, common name the Northland olive, is a medium-sized sea snail, a gastropod mollusc in the family Ancillariidae, the olives.

The status of this species is uncertain.

== Description ==
The length of the shell attains 19 mm, its diameter 9 mm.

== Distribution ==
This marine species is endemic to New Zealand and occurs in shallow waters off North Island.
