= Amalda cupedula =

Scientific classification
- Kingdom: Animalia
- Phylum: Mollusca
- Class: Gastropoda
- Subclass: Caenogastropoda
- Order: Neogastropoda
- Family: Ancillariidae
- Genus: Amalda
- Species: A. cupedula

Binomial name
- Amalda cupedula Kilburn, 1993

Species of gastropod

Amalda cupedula is a species of sea snail, a marine gastropod mollusk in the family Ancillariidae. It's named by R. N. Kilburn in 1993.

== Description ==
The length of the shell attains 16.4 mm, its diameter is 6.3 mm. It have a smooth, elongated spire; a typical olive‑shell morphology. It usually lives in sandy subtidal zones.

== Distribution ==
This marine species occurs off KwaZulu-Natal, South Africa.
