= Amalda virginea =

Scientific classification
- Kingdom: Animalia
- Phylum: Mollusca
- Class: Gastropoda
- Subclass: Caenogastropoda
- Order: Neogastropoda
- Family: Ancillariidae
- Genus: Amalda
- Species: A. virginea

Binomial name
- Amalda virginea Ninomiya, 1990

Synonyms
- Amalda (Alcospira) virgineus Ninomiya, 1990 (original combination; incorrect gender ending)

Species of gastropod

Amalda virginea is a species of sea snail, a marine gastropod mollusk in the family Ancillariidae.

== Distribution ==
This marine species is endemic to Australia and occurs off Western Australia.
