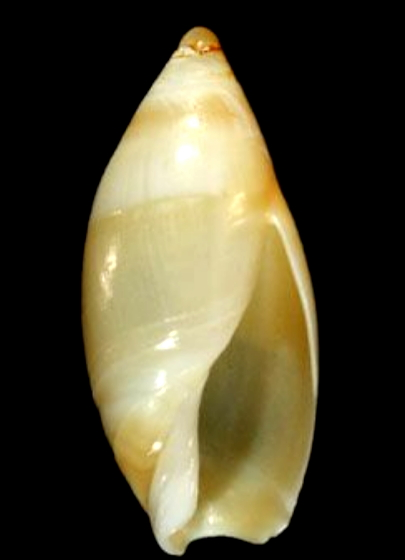
- Shell of Amalda josecarlosi (specimen at the Natural History Museum, Rotterdam)

Scientific classification
- Kingdom: Animalia
- Phylum: Mollusca
- Class: Gastropoda
- Subclass: Caenogastropoda
- Order: Neogastropoda
- Family: Ancillariidae
- Genus: Amalda
- Species: A. josecarlosi

Binomial name
- Amalda josecarlosi Pastorino, 2003

= Amalda josecarlosi =

Species of gastropod

Amalda josecarlosi is a recently discovered species of sea snail, a marine gastropod mollusk in the family Ancillariidae.

== Description ==
The length can be up to 22 mm in length. A new species of Ancillariinae (Gastropoda: Olividae) from the southwestern Atlantic Ocean. It has an eliptic-ovate shape with five smooth whorls that are flat. The radicula is rachiglossate with three cusps on its rachidian teeth.

== Distribution ==
This species lives at depths around 60 to 80 metres, off the East coast of Brazil.
