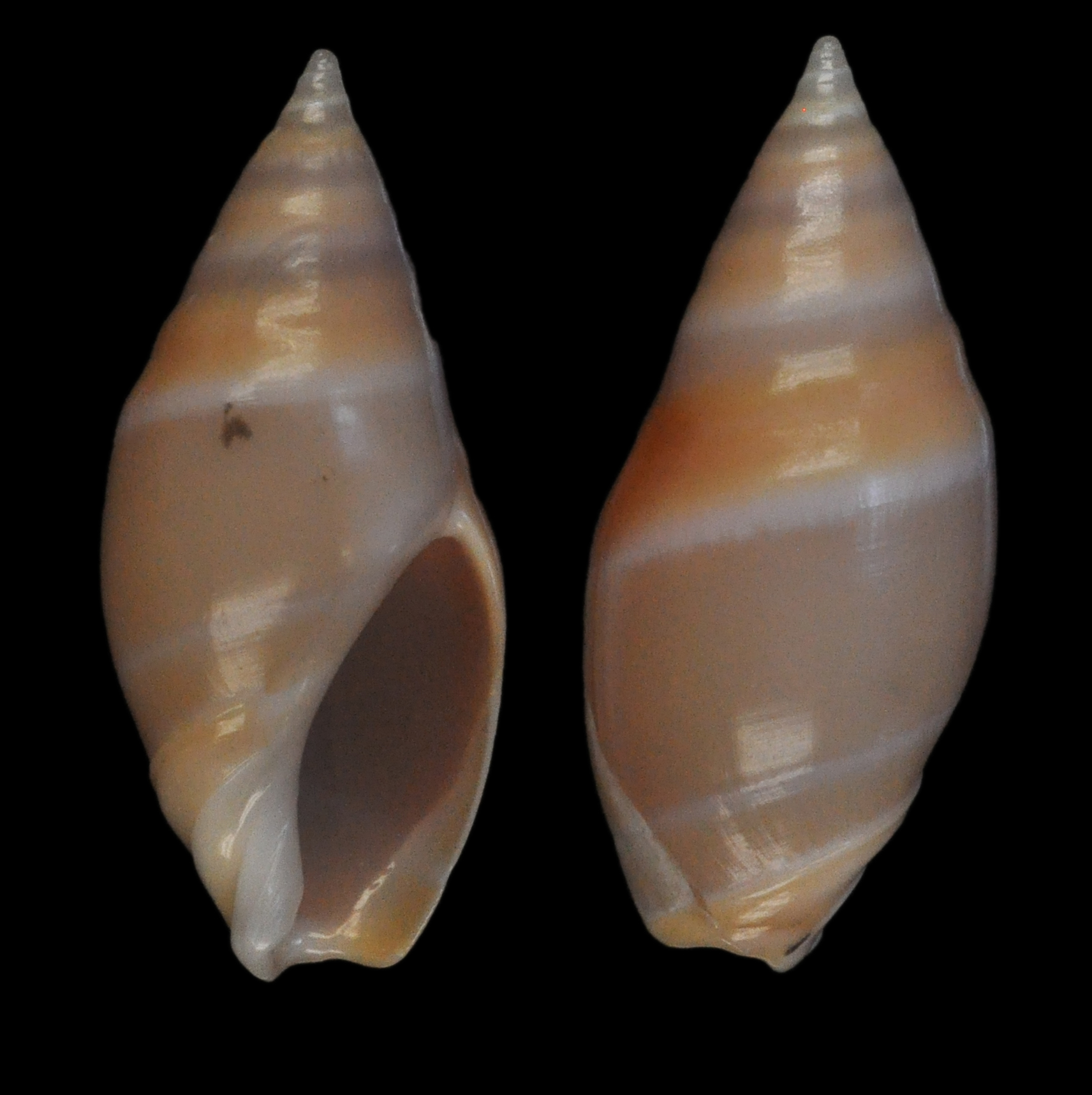
- Shell of Amalda hilgendorfi (specimen at MNHN, Paris)

Scientific classification
- Kingdom: Animalia
- Phylum: Mollusca
- Class: Gastropoda
- Subclass: Caenogastropoda
- Order: Neogastropoda
- Family: Ancillariidae
- Genus: Amalda
- Species: A. hilgendorfi

Binomial name
- Amalda hilgendorfi (Martens, 1897)

Synonyms
- Amalda hilgendorfi herlaari Van Pel, 1989; Amalda hilgendorfi hilgendorfi (Martens, 1897); Amalda hilgendorfi richeri Kilburn & Bouchet, 1988; Amalda hilgendorfi vezzaroi Cossignani, 2015; Ancillaria hilgendorfi E. von Martens, 1897 (original combination)

= Amalda hilgendorfi =

Species of gastropod

Amalda hilgendorfi is a species of sea snail, a marine gastropod mollusc in the family Ancillariidae, the olives.

== Description ==
This species attains a size of 50 mm, its diameter 18 mm.

(Original description in Latin) The shell is fusiform-turreted, very faintly grooved in spirals. It is violet-white in color, with a pale orange callus covering the upper whorls and the sutural area of the penultimate and body whorls. Near the base, there is a more violet-colored band bordered above by a spiral groove, followed by a slightly swollen, pale orange callus.

The aperture is rather narrowly elliptical, approximately half the total length of the shell. It is white, with a blunt outer edge that is very slightly arched and thickened above. Near the base, it shows a small denticle, while the basal margin is broadly notched. The columellar margin is slightly sinuous and is sculpted outwardly with several obliquely aligned, somewhat indistinct folds. A thin white callus extends onto the final and penultimate whorls.

== Distribution ==
Deep water: 400 metres. Broadly distributed in the West Pacific, recorded from Japan, the Philippines, Papua New Guinea and the Solomon Islands, eastern Australia, the Coral Sea, and New Caledonia.
