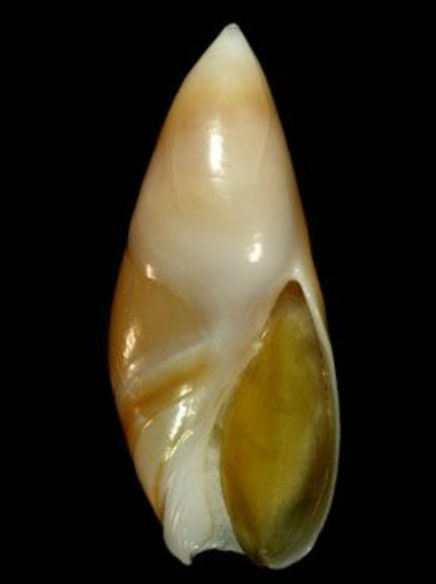
- Shell of Amalda bullioides (specimen at the Natural History Museum, Rotterdam)

Scientific classification
- Kingdom: Animalia
- Phylum: Mollusca
- Class: Gastropoda
- Subclass: Caenogastropoda
- Order: Neogastropoda
- Family: Ancillariidae
- Genus: Amalda
- Species: A. bullioides

Binomial name
- Amalda bullioides (Reeve, 1864)

Synonyms
- Ancillaria bullioides Reeve, 1864 (original combination)

= Amalda bullioides =

Species of gastropod

Amalda bullioides, common name bullet amalda, is a species of sea snail, a marine gastropod mollusk in the family Ancillariidae.

== Description ==
The length of the shell varies between 22 mm and 40 mm.

The shell is bullet-shaped, smooth, and glossy, with an enamel-like callus that envelops the spire and parietal region, effectively covering the sutures. The aperture is elongated, tapering towards the apex, and features a broad siphonal notch. The inner lip is concave, while the outer lip is thin and delicate.

Fresh shells range in color from orange to brown, with the darkest hues concentrated around the suture. The body whorl features two narrow white bands separated by a broad orange band, with a thin orange-brown band positioned just below the lower white band. The columella and the tip of the spire are whitish. Older shells tend to lose their vibrant colors and appear much faded over time.

== Distribution ==
This marine species occurs off the Western Cape and the Agulhas Bank, South Africa.
