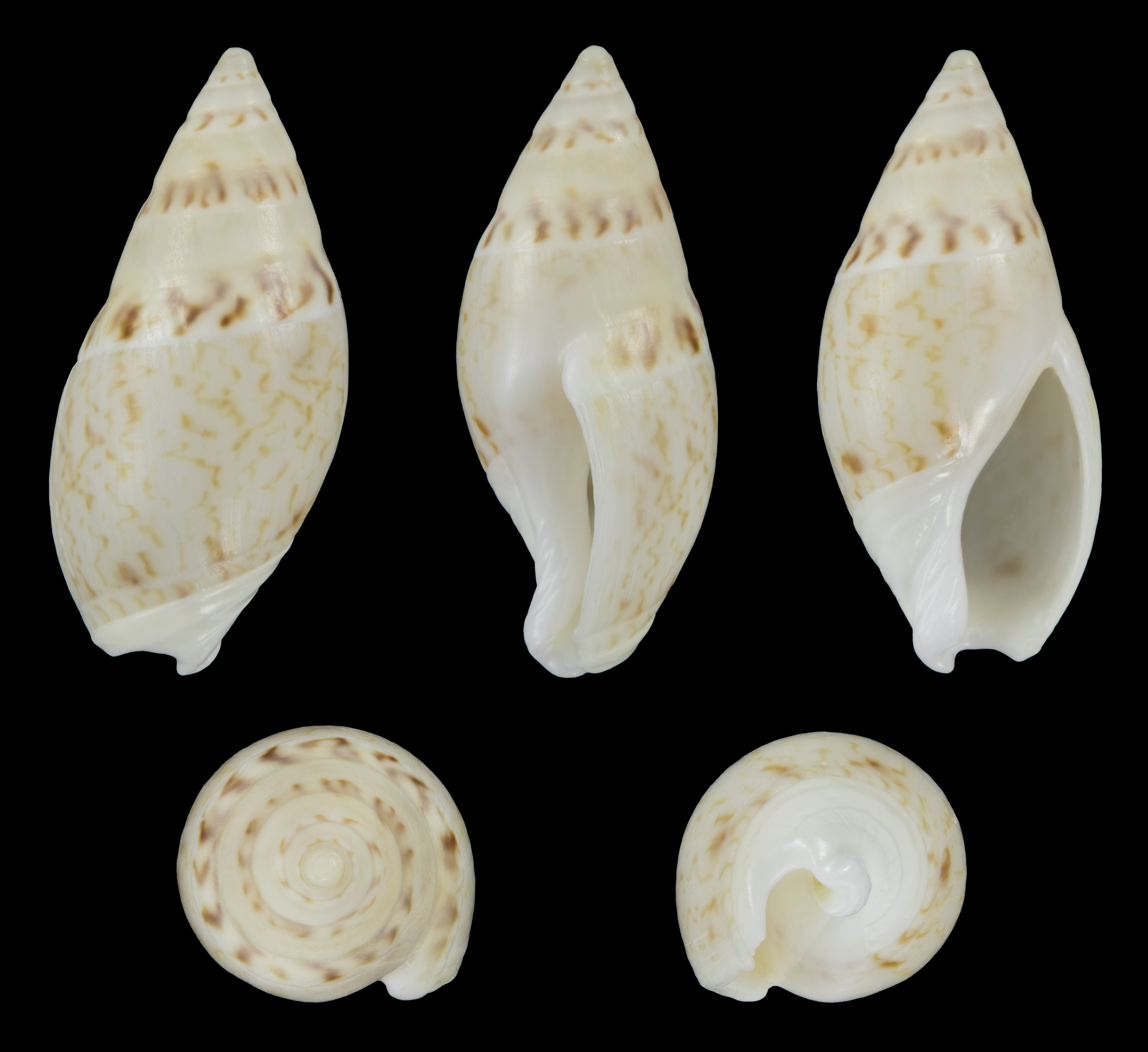

Scientific classification
- Kingdom: Animalia
- Phylum: Mollusca
- Class: Gastropoda
- Subclass: Caenogastropoda
- Order: Neogastropoda
- Family: Ancillariidae
- Genus: Amalda
- Species: A. monilifera

Binomial name
- Amalda monilifera (Reeve, 1864)

Synonyms
- Ancilla monilifera (Reeve, 1864) superseded combination; Ancillaria monilifera Reeve, 1864 superseded combination; Gracilispira monilifera Wilson 1994

= Amalda monilifera =

Species of gastropod

Amalda monilifera is a species of sea snail, a marine gastropod mollusk in the family Ancillariidae.

== Description ==
The length of the shell attains 18 mm.

The shell is ovate-fusiform, featuring aconical spire with nearly straight sides. The primary spire callus is thin, semi-transparent, and smooth, covering all whorls except the protoconch. The protoconch is rounded at the top, with an indistinct boundary to the teleoconch, and the first whorl measures 0.65 mm in diameter. The secondary callus is of medium thickness on the parietal wall, forming a distinct parietal pad that extends only to the penultimate whorl.

The plication plate has three weak ridges, with two additional weaker ridges on the columella. The olivoid groove is distinct but shallow, and the denticle of the outer lip is prominent, with a narrow triangular shape. The upper anterior band is weakly convex, featuring a low median ridge, while the lower anterior band is nearly flat and smooth.

The primary callus is light orange, while the body whorl cloak is creamy with a light brown, anastomosing pattern. Subsutural areas show a row of large, irregular oval brown spots, visible through the transparent callus on all teleoconch whorls. The olivoid and lower anterior bands also feature a row of brown spots, and the plication plate is creamy.

== Distribution ==
This marine species is endemic to Australia and occurs off Western Australia.
