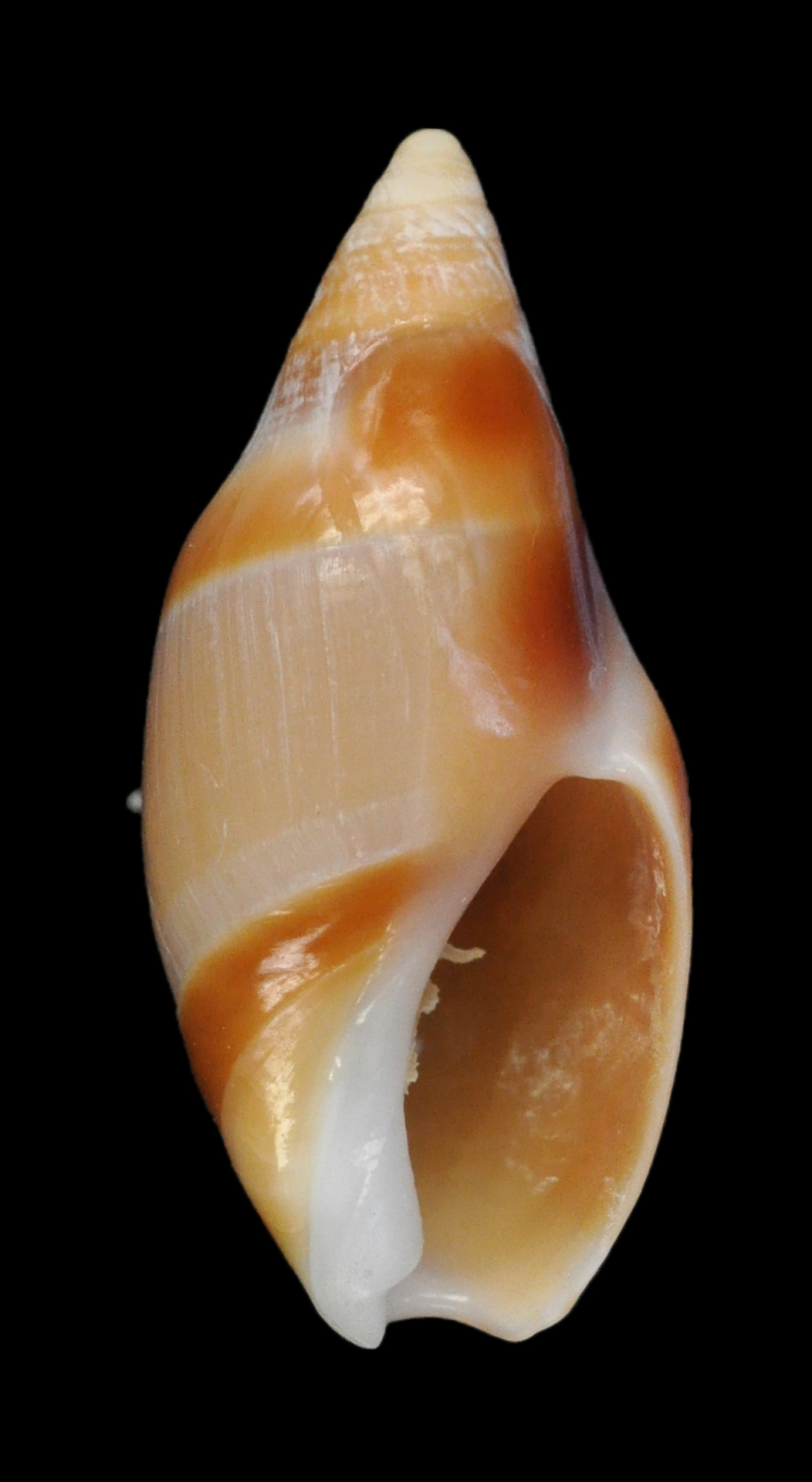
- Shell of Amalda fuscolingua (specimen at MNHN, Paris)

Scientific classification
- Kingdom: Animalia
- Phylum: Mollusca
- Class: Gastropoda
- Subclass: Caenogastropoda
- Order: Neogastropoda
- Family: Ancillariidae
- Genus: Amalda
- Species: A. fuscolingua

Binomial name
- Amalda fuscolingua Kilburn & Bouchet, 1988

= Amalda fuscolingua =

Species of gastropod

Amalda fuscolingua is a species of sea snail, a marine gastropod mollusc in the family Ancillariidae, the olives.

== Description ==
The length of the shell attains 57 mm.

The shell is ovate-fusiform with a blunt orthoconoid spire. The primary spire callus is thick and micro-shagreened, covering all whorls except for 1–1.5 protoconch whorls. The diameter of the first protoconch whorl is 0.92–1.06 mm (mean 0.98 mm, n = 5). The secondary callus is also thick, seamlessly merging with the parietal callus without a visible border, and extends to the suture of the antepenultimate whorl. The plication plate has 3–6 ridges, with all but the outer two being weak, and the columella is smooth.

The olivoid groove is very shallow to nearly obsolete, and the labral denticle is very small, obtuse, or absent. The upper anterior band is nearly flat, except for a weak, low ridge in the submedian area. The lower anterior band is also nearly flat and micro-shagreened.

The primary callus is orange-brown in the lower part and brown on the spire, with distinct, strongly prosocline lighter axial lines. The secondary callus is orange-brown. The body whorl cloak is a light yellowish-brown, with the olivoid band usually slightly lighter. The anterior band is orange-brown, with the upper anterior band slightly darker, matching the cloak's color, and the plication plate is white.

== Distribution ==
Pacific Ocean: off southern New Caledonia at 450 m. depth.
