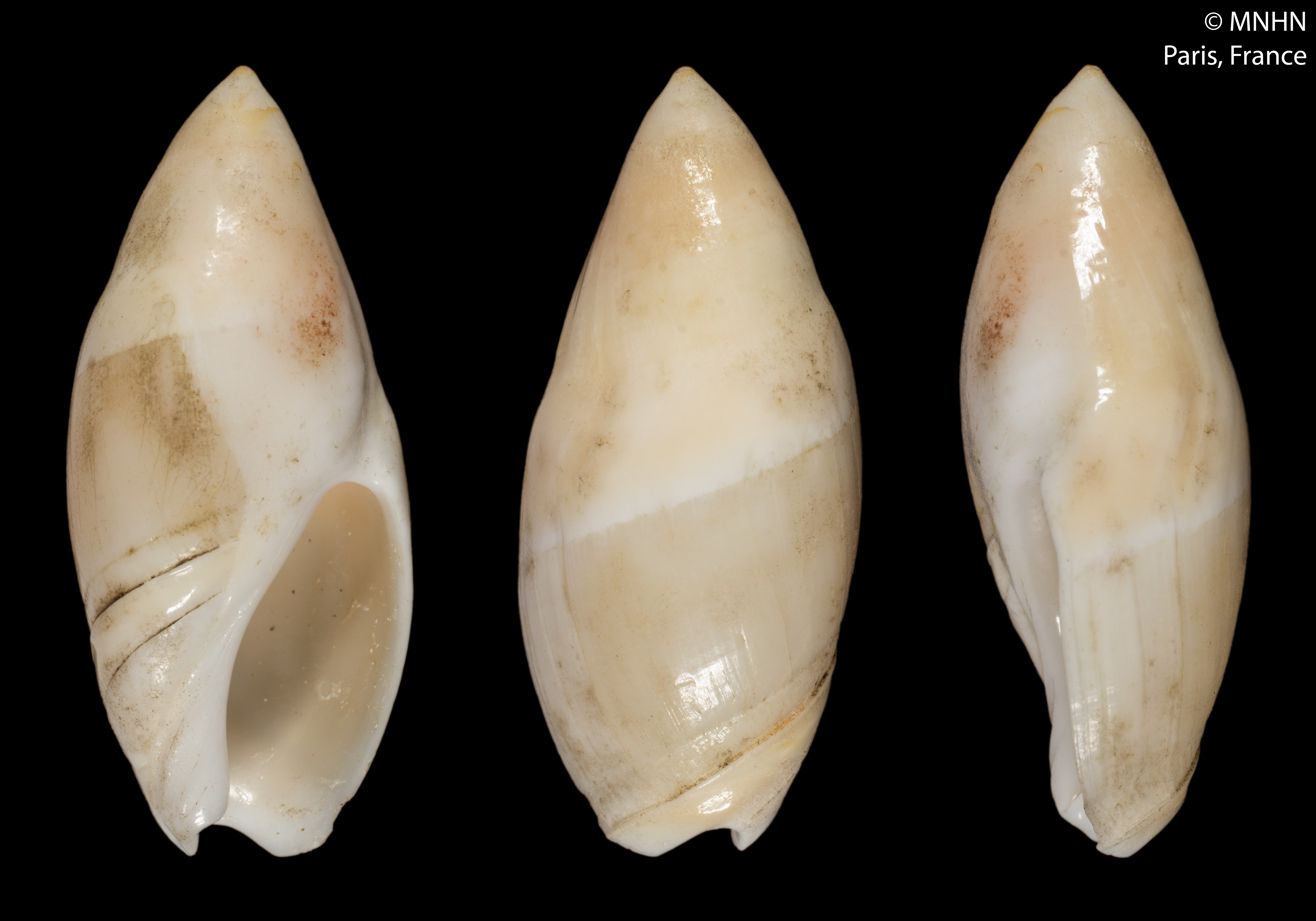
- Shell of Amalda montrouzieri (holotype at MNHN, Paris)

Scientific classification
- Kingdom: Animalia
- Phylum: Mollusca
- Class: Gastropoda
- Subclass: Caenogastropoda
- Order: Neogastropoda
- Family: Ancillariidae
- Genus: Amalda
- Species: A. montrouzieri

Binomial name
- Amalda montrouzieri (Souverby, 1860)

Synonyms
- Ancillaria montrouzieri Souverbie, 1860 (original combination)

= Amalda montrouzieri =

Species of gastropod

Amalda montrouzieri is a species of sea snail, a marine gastropod mollusc in the family Ancillariidae, the olives.

== Description ==
The length of the shell attains 41.5 mm.

The shell is ovate-fusiform with a cyrtoconoid spire. The primary spire callus is thick and weakly micro-shagreened, covering all the whorls, including most of the protoconch, making precise measurements difficult. It features weak spiral lirae, with 8–10 on the penultimate whorl. The secondary callus is moderately thick, forming an extensive pad on the right side of the spire. The plication plate has 2–4 ridges, typically 3. The olivoid groove ranges from shallow to moderately deep, while the denticle of the outer lip is weak and rounded. The upper anterior band is very slightly convex, almost flat, and the lower anterior band is flat and smooth.

The shell color ranges from uniform white to chestnut brown. In darker specimens, the primary spire callus and upper anterior band are darker, while the olivoid band is lighter than the body whorl cloak, and the plication plate is white.

== Distribution ==
Almada montrouzieri is typically distributed 10 meters (33 ft) to 70 meters (230 ft) below sea level in the areas around Southern New Caledonia, with sightings as deep as 280 meters (920 ft) attested. It has also been anecdotally attested in or around the Loyalty Islands, Fiji, the Ryukyu Islands, and the Philippines.
