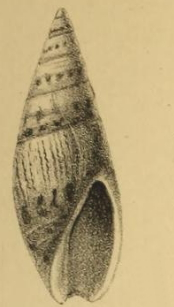
- Shell of Amalda tindalli (holotype)

Scientific classification
- Kingdom: Animalia
- Phylum: Mollusca
- Class: Gastropoda
- Subclass: Caenogastropoda
- Order: Neogastropoda
- Family: Ancillariidae
- Genus: Amalda
- Species: A. tindalli

Binomial name
- Amalda tindalli (Melvill, 1898)

Synonyms
- Ancilla tindalli Melvill, 1898

= Amalda tindalli =

Species of mollusc

Amalda tindalli is a species of sea snail, a marine gastropod mollusk in the family Ancillariidae.

The taxonomy status is uncertain.

== Description ==
The length of the shell attains 17 mm, its diameter 8 mm.

(Original description in Latin) The shell is oblong-fusiform, tapering gracefully at the apex, and exhibits a highly glossy surface in shades of pale straw-yellow to ochreous. It comprises seven to eight whorls, the first three being apical, translucent, and glass-like, while the remaining are subtly grooved transversely just below the sutures, with the interspaces adorned by a chestnut hue. The body whorl is minimally expanded, displaying a cinnamon-chestnut ochreous tone at its midsection, delicately lined when viewed under magnification, and accented near the base by a pale chestnut band. The aperture is ovate-oblong, whitish on the interior, with an outer lip that is only slightly flared. The columellar margin is subtly thickened, enhancing the overall lustrous appearance.

== Distribution ==
This marine species occurs off the Angria Bank, India and off Sri Lanka.
