= Amalda lactea =

Scientific classification
- Kingdom: Animalia
- Phylum: Mollusca
- Class: Gastropoda
- Subclass: Caenogastropoda
- Order: Neogastropoda
- Family: Ancillariidae
- Genus: Amalda
- Species: A. lactea

Binomial name
- Amalda lactea Kuroda, 1960

Synonyms
- Baryspira lactea Kuroda, 1960 (original combination)

Species of gastropod

Amalda lactea is a species of sea snail, a marine gastropod mollusk in the family Ancillariidae.

== Distribution ==
This marine species occurs off Okinawa and Bonaire, Sint Eustatius and Saba.
