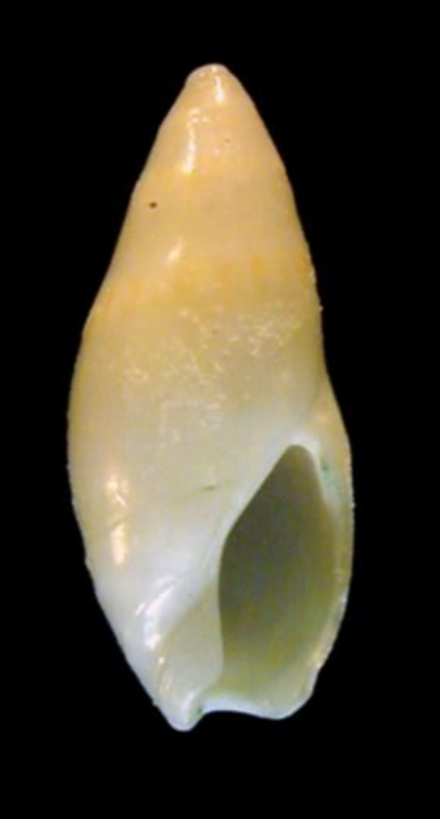
- Shell of Amalda pinguis (holotype at the Australian Museum)

Scientific classification
- Kingdom: Animalia
- Phylum: Mollusca
- Class: Gastropoda
- Subclass: Caenogastropoda
- Order: Neogastropoda
- Family: Ancillariidae
- Genus: Amalda
- Species: A. pinguis

Binomial name
- Amalda pinguis Ninomiya, 1991

Synonyms
- Amalda (Mundaspira) pinguis Ninomiya, 1991; Gracilispira pinguis (Ninomiya, 1991)

= Amalda pinguis =

Species of gastropod

Amalda pinguis is a species of sea snail, a marine gastropod mollusk in the family Ancillariidae.

== Taxonomy ==
Status uncertain.

== Distribution ==
This marine species is endemic to Australia and occurs off South Australia.
