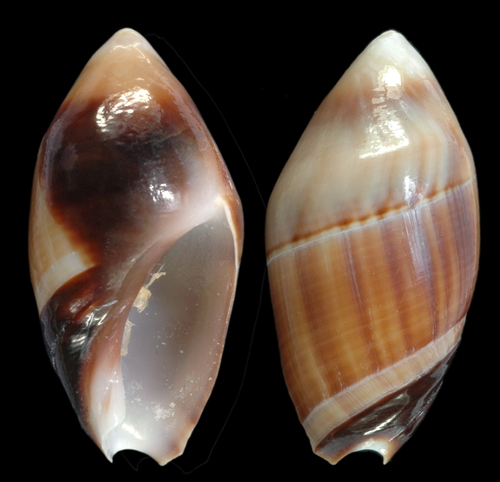
- Shell of Amalda contusa (specimen at MNHN, Paris)

Scientific classification
- Kingdom: Animalia
- Phylum: Mollusca
- Class: Gastropoda
- Subclass: Caenogastropoda
- Order: Neogastropoda
- Family: Ancillariidae
- Genus: Amalda
- Species: A. contusa

Binomial name
- Amalda contusa (Reeve, 1864)

Synonyms
- Ancilla contusa (Reeve, 1864); Ancillaria contusa Reeve, 1864 (original combination)

= Amalda contusa =

Species of gastropod

Amalda contusa is a species of sea snail, a marine gastropod mollusk in the family Ancillariidae.

== Description ==
The length of the shell attains 25 mm.

The shell is broadly ovate with a narrow base and a low, conical spire. The primary spire callus is very thick, smooth, and glossy, covering all whorls except for the tip of the protoconch, making precise measurements impossible. The secondary callus is also thick, with a distinct anterior border, smooth and glossy, merging seamlessly with the parietal callus and extending to the shell apex.

The plication plate is smooth and separated from the anterior band by a broad, deep groove, while the columella is smooth. The olivoid groove is shallow but distinct, and the denticle of the outer lip is short and obtuse. Both the upper and lower anterior bands are smooth and weakly convex.

The primary callus is a milky-caramel color, adorned with irregularly positioned sinuous brownish axial lines, and bordered abapically by a series of interrupted, narrow spiral brown and lighter lines. The secondary callus is dark brown, gradually lightening near the aperture. The body whorl cloak has a caramel-colored background, featuring irregularly spaced orthocline brown axial bands of uneven width, interspersed with lighter spiral lines. The olivoid band is much lighter than the cloak but in the same tone, while the anterior band is very dark brown, lightening to brown near the columella and becoming very light brown abapically.

== Distribution ==
This marine species occurs off KwaZulu-Natal, South Africa and Mozambique,
