= Amalda bulbosa =

Scientific classification
- Kingdom: Animalia
- Phylum: Mollusca
- Class: Gastropoda
- Subclass: Caenogastropoda
- Order: Neogastropoda
- Family: Ancillariidae
- Genus: Amalda
- Species: A. bulbosa

Binomial name
- Amalda bulbosa Ninomiya, 1991

Synonyms
- Amalda (Exiquaspira) bulbosa Ninomiya, T. 1991; Exiquaspira bulbosa (Ninomiya, 1991)

Species of gastropod

Amalda bulbosa is a species of sea snail, a marine gastropod mollusk in the family Ancillariidae.

== Taxonomy ==
Status uncertain.

== Distribution ==
This marine species is endemic to Western Australia.
