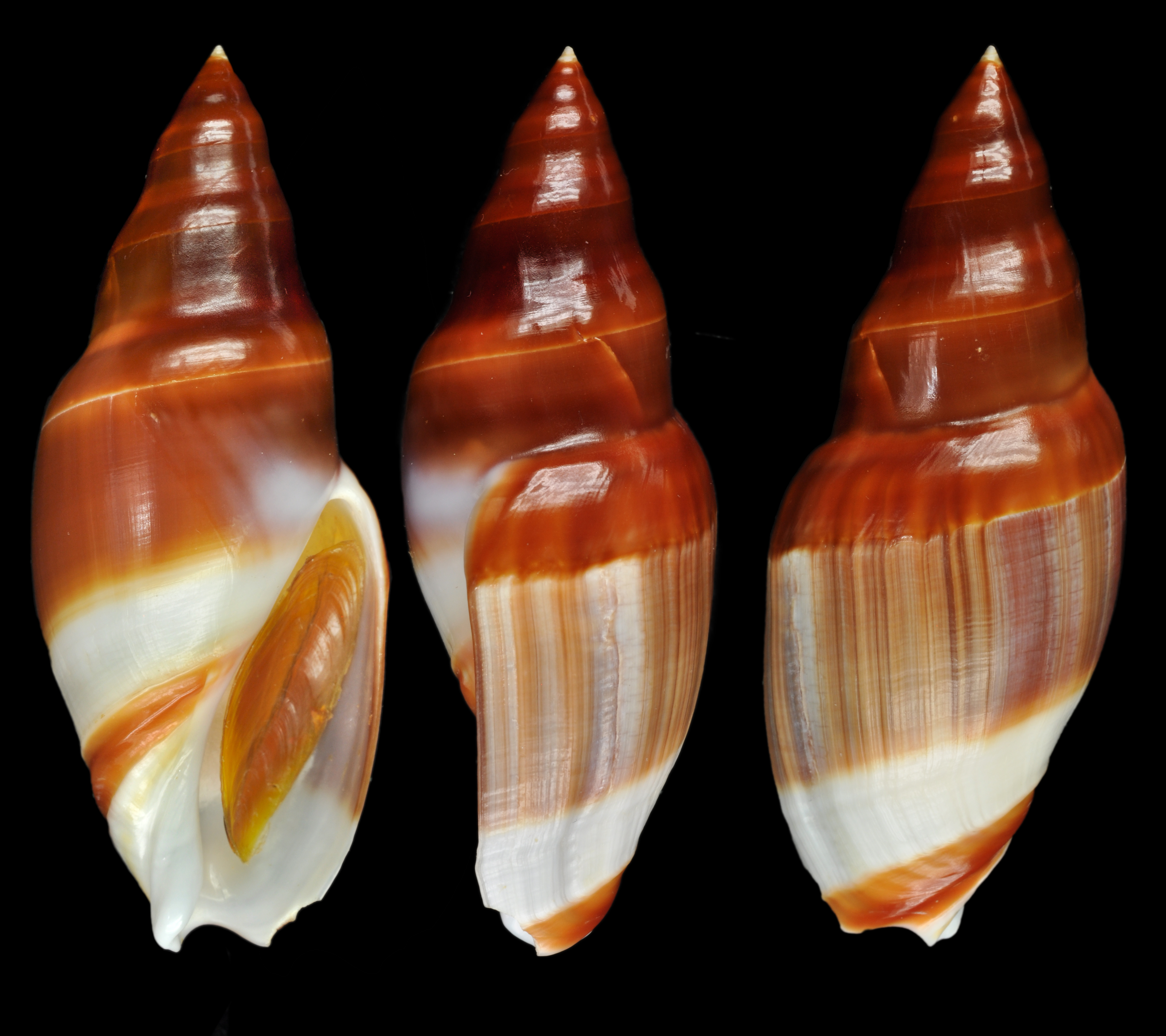
- Shell of Amalda cacao (holotype at MNHN, Paris)

Scientific classification
- Kingdom: Animalia
- Phylum: Mollusca
- Class: Gastropoda
- Subclass: Caenogastropoda
- Order: Neogastropoda
- Family: Ancillariidae
- Genus: Amalda
- Species: A. cacao

Binomial name
- Amalda cacao Kantor, Castelin, Fedosov & Bouchet, 2020

Synonyms
- Amalda cf. hilgendorfi richeri Gratecap 2014

= Amalda cacao =

Species of gastropod

Amalda cacao is a species of sea snail, a marine gastropod mollusk in the family Ancillariidae.

== Description ==
The length of the shell attains 75 mm, its diameter 40 mm.

The shell is fusiform with turreted whorls and a small, broadly dome-shaped protoconch, with the diameter of the first whorl around 0.7 mm. Both the primary and secondary calluses are distinctly micro-shagreened. The border between the primary callus and the body whorl cloak is sharply defined by a thin, lighter line. The olivoid groove is very shallow and almost obsolete on most of the body whorl. The anterior band is divided by a prominent fasciolar ridge into an upper and slightly narrower lower band. The upper anterior band features a distinct ridge, triangular in cross-section.

The body whorl cloak is chestnut-colored on the apertural side and lighter on the dorsal side, with alternating axial lines in varying shades. The olivoid band and the adjacent narrow zone of the body whorl cloak are white, while the anterior band is chestnut brown. The plication plate is white with a faint yellowish spiral band. Both the primary and secondary calluses are dark chocolate brown, while the parietal pad is light with a bluish tint. The protoconch is white.

== Distribution ==
This marine species occurs in the Coral Sea.
