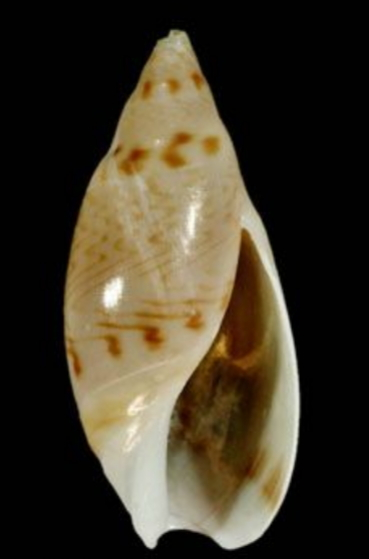
- Shell of Amalda festiva (specimen at the Natural History Museum, Rotterdam)

Scientific classification
- Kingdom: Animalia
- Phylum: Mollusca
- Class: Gastropoda
- Subclass: Caenogastropoda
- Order: Neogastropoda
- Family: Ancillariidae
- Genus: Amalda
- Species: A. festiva

Binomial name
- Amalda festiva Ninomiya, 1991

Synonyms
- Amalda (Exiquaspira) festiva Ninomiya, T. 1991; Exiquaspira festiva (Ninomiya, 1991)

= Amalda festiva =

Species of gastropod

Amalda festiva is a species of sea snail, a marine gastropod mollusk in the family Ancillariidae, the olives.

== Description ==
The length of the shell attains 20 mm.

== Distribution ==
This marine species is endemic to Australia and occurs off New South Wales.
