= Amalda southlandica =

Scientific classification
- Kingdom: Animalia
- Phylum: Mollusca
- Class: Gastropoda
- Subclass: Caenogastropoda
- Order: Neogastropoda
- Family: Ancillariidae
- Genus: Amalda
- Species: A. southlandica

Binomial name
- Amalda southlandica (Fleming, 1948)

Synonyms
- Baryspira southlandica Fleming, 1948

Species of gastropod

Amalda southlandica, is a poorly known species of sea snail, a marine gastropod mollusc in the family Ancillariidae.

The evaluation of the species remains incomplete, because so far only juveniles have been found. Juvenile specimens of this olive have been found at depths of between 25 and 60 m.

== Distribution ==
This marine species is endemic to New Zealand and occurs off Fiordland.
