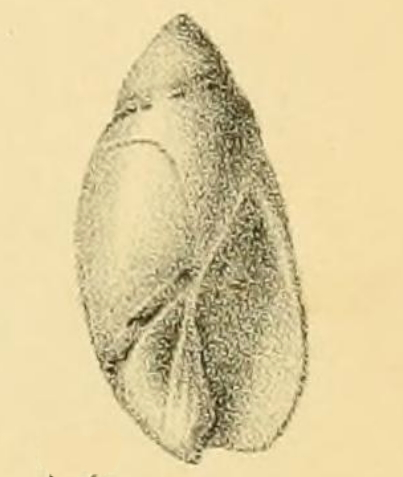
- Shell of Amalda reevei (holotype)

Scientific classification
- Kingdom: Animalia
- Phylum: Mollusca
- Class: Gastropoda
- Subclass: Caenogastropoda
- Order: Neogastropoda
- Family: Ancillariidae
- Genus: Amalda
- Species: A. reevei

Binomial name
- Amalda reevei (E.A. Smith, 1904)

Synonyms
- Amalda callifera Thiele, 1925; Ancilla reevei E. A. Smith, 1904 (original combination); Ancilla reevei var. bipartita W. H. Turton, 1932 (junior synonym)

= Amalda reevei =

Species of gastropod

Amalda reevei is a species of sea snail, a marine gastropod mollusk in the family Ancillariidae.

== Description ==
The length of the shell attains 22 mm, its diameter 10 mm.

(Original description in Latin) The smooth shell is elongate-ovate. It is pale flesh-colored, lighter below the suture. The spire is more or less covered with a pale callus. The shell contains about 5 whorls, with the body whorl large, elongated, and slightly convex, with two oblique grooves in front, and a brown-spotted band between the grooves. The outer lip is pale and slightly curved. The columella is thickened at the front, somewhat reflexed, obliquely grooved, and either white or pale pink.

== Distribution ==
This marine species occurs off Port Alfred, South Africa.
