= Amalda ornata =

Scientific classification
- Kingdom: Animalia
- Phylum: Mollusca
- Class: Gastropoda
- Subclass: Caenogastropoda
- Order: Neogastropoda
- Family: Ancillariidae
- Genus: Amalda
- Species: A. ornata

Binomial name
- Amalda ornata Ninomiya, 1988

Synonyms
- Amalda (Exiquaspira) ornata Ninomiya, 1988 ·; Exiquaspira ornata (Ninomiya, 1988)

Species of gastropod

Amalda ornata is a species of sea snail, a marine gastropod mollusk belonging to the family Ancillariidae, the olives.

== Description ==
The length of the shell attains 26.4 mm, its diameter 10.8 mm.

== Distribution ==
The marine species occurs off Esperance Bay, Western Australia.
