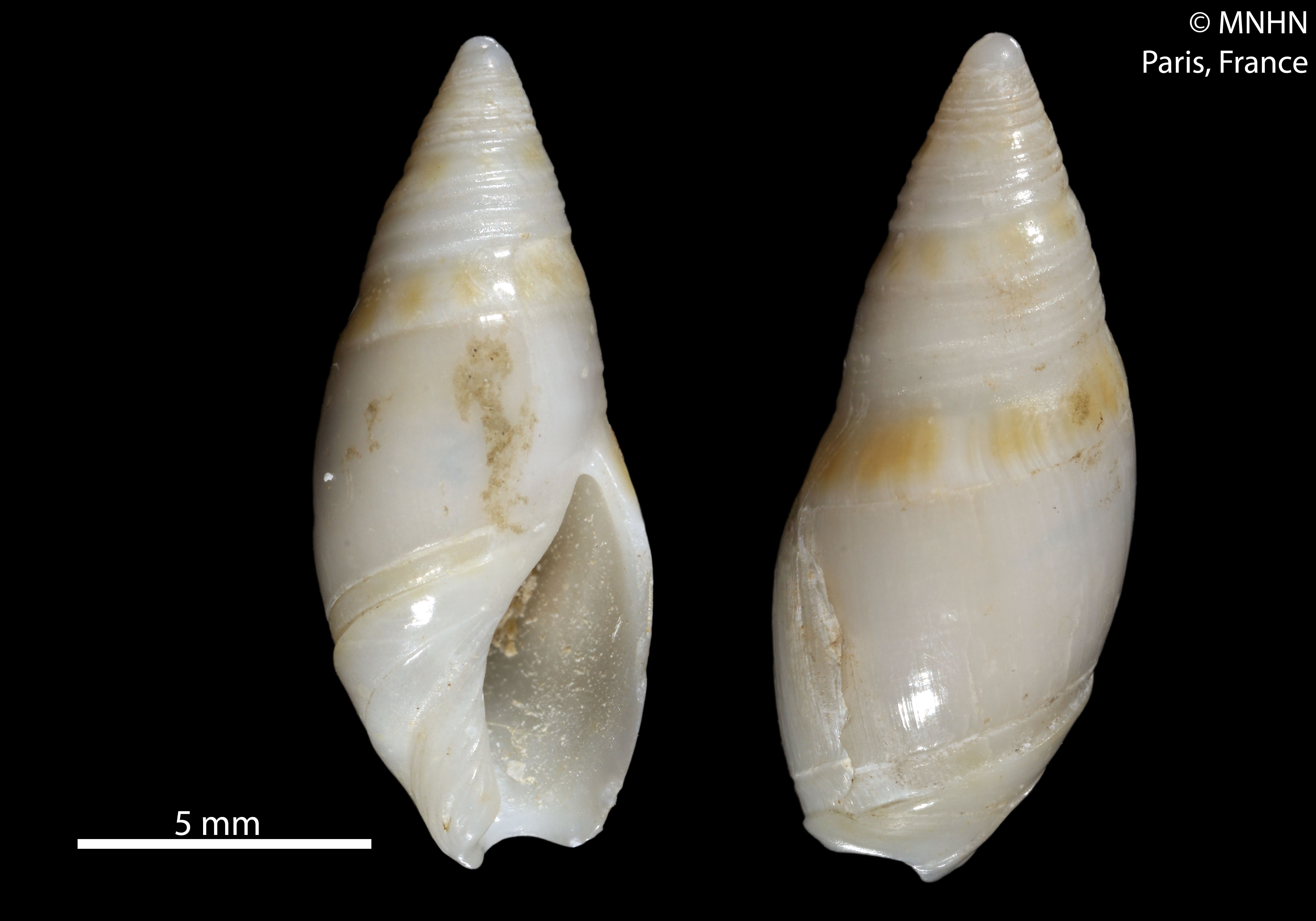
- Shell of Amalda lochii (specimen at MNHN, Paris)

Scientific classification
- Kingdom: Animalia
- Phylum: Mollusca
- Class: Gastropoda
- Subclass: Caenogastropoda
- Order: Neogastropoda
- Family: Ancillariidae
- Genus: Amalda
- Species: A. lochii

Binomial name
- Amalda lochii Ninomiya, 1990

Synonyms
- Amalda (Alocospira) lochii Ninomiya, T. 1990

= Amalda lochii =

Species of gastropod

Amalda lochii is a species of sea snail, a marine gastropod mollusk in the family Ancillariidae, the olives.

The status of this species is uncertain.

== Distribution ==
This marine species is endemic to Australia and occurs off the Northern Territory and Queensland.
