= Amalda rottnestensis =

Scientific classification
- Kingdom: Animalia
- Phylum: Mollusca
- Class: Gastropoda
- Subclass: Caenogastropoda
- Order: Neogastropoda
- Family: Ancillariidae
- Genus: Amalda
- Species: A. rottnestensis

Binomial name
- Amalda rottnestensis Ninomiya, 1991

Synonyms
- Exiquaspira rottnestensis (Ninomiya, 1991); Amalda (Exiquaspira) rottnestensis Ninomiya, T. 1991

Species of gastropod

Amalda rottnestensis is a species of sea snail, a marine gastropod mollusk in the family Ancillariidae.

== Taxonomy ==
Status uncertain.

== Distribution ==
This marine species is endemic to Australia and occurs off Western Australia.
