= Amalda herberti =

Scientific classification
- Kingdom: Animalia
- Phylum: Mollusca
- Class: Gastropoda
- Subclass: Caenogastropoda
- Order: Neogastropoda
- Family: Ancillariidae
- Genus: Amalda
- Species: A. herberti

Binomial name
- Amalda herberti T. Cossignani, 2013

Species of gastropod

Amalda herberti is a species of sea snail, a marine gastropod mollusk in the family Ancillariidae, the olives.

== Distribution ==
The marine species occurs off New Caledonia.
