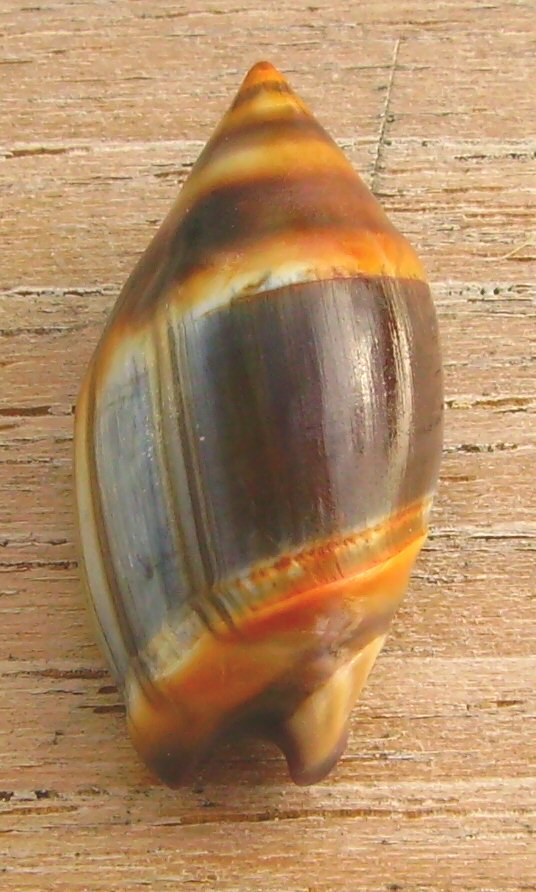
- A shell of Amalda australis

Scientific classification
- Kingdom: Animalia
- Phylum: Mollusca
- Class: Gastropoda
- Subclass: Caenogastropoda
- Order: Neogastropoda
- Superfamily: Olivoidea
- Family: Ancillariidae
- Genus: Amalda; H. Adams & A. Adams, 1853

Type species
- Amalda tankervillii Swainson, W.A., 1825

Species
- See text

Synonyms
- Amalda (Amalda) H. Adams & A. Adams, 1853 accepted, alternate representation; Amalda (Baryspira) P. Fischer, 1883 · accepted, alternate representation; Amalda (Exiquaspira) Ninomiya, 1988 alternative representation; Amalda (Gracilispira) Olson, 1956 · accepted, alternate representation; Amalda (Mundaspira) Ninomiya, 1990· accepted, alternate representation; Amalda (Mundaspira) Ninomiya, 1990· accepted, alternate representation; † Amalda (Pinguispira) Finlay, 1926 · accepted, alternate representation; Amalda (Spinaspira) Olson, 1956 · accepted, alternate representation; Ancilla (Baryspira) P. Fischer, 1883; Ancilla (Pinguispira) Finlay, 1926; Ancillaria (Amalda) H. Adams & A. Adams, 1853 superseded rank; Austrancilla Habe, 1959; Baryspira Fischer, 1883; † Baryspira (Gemaspira) Olson, 1956; † Baryspira (Gracilispira) Olson, 1956; Baryspira (Pinguispira) Finlay, 1926; Baryspira (Spinaspira) Olson, 1956; Dipsaccus (Amalda) H. Adams & A. Adams, 1853 (original rank); Gracilispira Olsson, 1956; Sandella Gray, 1857

= Amalda =

Genus of gastropods

Amalda is a genus of medium-sized sea snails, a marine gastropod mollusc in the family Ancillariidae, the olives and allies.

== Description ==
The thin shell is not umbilicated. The spire is elongated with the suture enamelled. The primary spire callus covers most of the spire, including at least part of the protoconch, leaving in most cases only the first protoconch whorl exposed. The inner lip has the callus moderate, defined. The outer lip is simple.

== Distribution ==
These snails usually live in the sand in fairly shallow water in tropical and temperate regions of the world with a particularly rich fauna in Australia and the Indo-West Pacific. Most species are predators of marine bivalves.

In general, both shallow and deep-water species of Amalda tend to have relatively narrow distribution ranges within the Indo-Pacific, where local faunas are often dominated by narrow endemics, particularly in South Africa and, to a lesser extent, Australia. While some species exhibit broader distributions—such as A. hinomotoensis, found from Japan to Taiwan, and A. mamillata, present in regions including Indonesia, the Strait of Malacca, Vietnam, and the China Seas (Gratecap 2016b)—such broad distributions should be interpreted with caution.

== Species ==
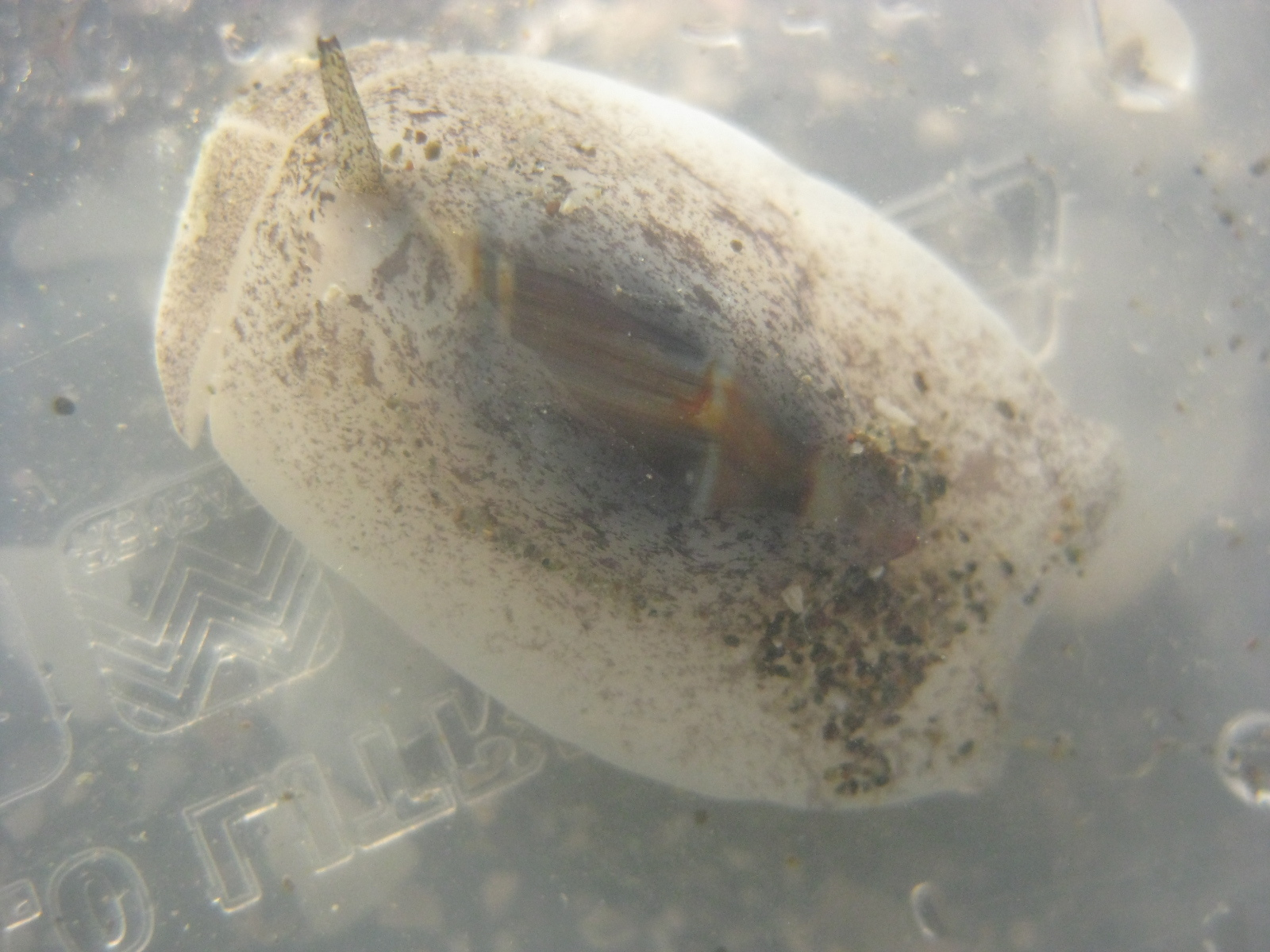
A live Amalda australis collected from seagrass bed at Kohimarama Beach, Auckland

Species within the genus Amalda include:

- † Amalda abessensis Lozouet, 1992
- Amalda abyssicola Schepman, 1911
- Amalda acuta Ninomiya, 1991
- † Amalda acutapex Raven & Recourt, 2018
- † Amalda adelaidensis (Ludbrook, 1958)
- Amalda alabaster Kantor, Castelin, Fedosov & Bouchet, 2020
- Amalda albanyensis Ninomiya, 1987
- Amalda albocallosa (Lischke, 1873)
- † Amalda allani (Olson, 1956)
- Amalda allaryi Bozetti, 2007
- Amalda angustata (G.B. Sowerby II, 1859)
- † Amalda anomala (Schlotheim, 1820)
- † Amalda arenaria (Cossmann, 1889)
- † Amalda aturensis (Peyrot, 1928)
- † Amalda auberi Chavan, 1965
- Amalda aureocallosa Shikama & Oishi, 1977
- Amalda aureomarginata Kilburn & Bouchet, 1988
- Amalda aureus Ninomiya, 1990
- Amalda australis (G.B. Sowerby I, 1830)
- Amalda bathamae (Dell, 1956)
- Amalda beachportensis (Verco, 1909)
- Amalda bellonarum Kilburn & Bouchet, 1988
- Amalda benthicola (Dell, 1956)
- † Amalda bibhae Banerjee & Halder, 2024
- Amalda booleyi (Melvill & Sykes, 1896)
- Amalda borshengi Lan & Lee, 2002
- † Amalda brevicula (Marwick, 1931)
- † Amalda bruneiana Harzhauser, Raven & Landau, 2018
- Amalda bulbosa Ninomiya, 1991
- Amalda bullioides (Reeve, 1864)
- Amalda cacao Kantor, Castelin, Fedosov & Bouchet, 2020
- † Amalda cincta (P. Marshall, 1918)
- † Amalda cingulata (Olson, 1956)
- Amalda coccinata Kilburn, 1980
- Amalda coenobium Ninomiya, 1991
- Amalda colemani Ninomiya, 1991
- Amalda concinna Ninomiya, 1990
- Amalda contusa (Reeve, 1864)
- Amalda coriolis Kilburn & Bouchet, 1988
- Amalda crosnieri Kilburn, 1977
- Amalda cupedula Kilburn, 1993
- Amalda danilai Kilburn, 1996
- Amalda decipiens (G. B. Sowerby III, 1897)
- Amalda degalleaniae Cossignani, 2018
- Amalda depressa (G.B. Sowerby II, 1859)
- Amalda dimidiata (G.B. Sowerby II, 1859)
- † Amalda dubia (Deshayes, 1830)
- Amalda edgariana Schepman, 1911
- Amalda edithae (Pritchard & Gabriel, 1898)
- † Amalda elongata (Deshayes, 1830)
- † Amalda exsputa (Bartrum & Powell, 1928)
- Amalda fasciata Ninomiya, 1991
- Amalda festiva Ninomiya, 1991
- Amalda fuscolingua Kilburn & Bouchet, 1988
- Amalda gabelishi Ninomiya, 1988
- † Amalda garsensis Lozouet, 2011
- † Amalda gigartoides (Olson, 1956)
- † Amalda glandiformis (Lamarck, 1811)
- † Amalda gobanus Vrinat, 2025
- † Amalda gulosa (C. A. Fleming, 1943)
- Amalda harasewychi Thach, 2016
- Amalda hayashii Ninomiya, 1988
- Amalda herberti Cossignani, 2013
- Amalda hilgendorfi (Martens, 1897)
- Amalda hinomotoensis (Yokoyama, 1922)
- † Amalda ivrigleyi (Chavan & M. Fischer, 1939)
- Amalda jenneri Kilburn, 1977
- Amalda josecarlosi Pastorino, 2003
- Amalda lactea T. Kuroda, 1960
- Amalda lematrei Kilburn, 1977
- † Amalda ligata (Tate, 1889)
- Amalda lindae Kilburn, 1993
- Amalda lineata (Kiener, 1844)
- Amalda lochii Ninomiya, 1990
- † Amalda macbeathi (Vella, 1954)
- † Amalda malacitana Vera-Peláez, 2022
- Amalda mamillata (Hinds, 1844)
- Amalda marginata (Lamarck, 1811)
- Amalda mirabelflorenti Cossignani, 2018
- † Amalda miriensis Raven & Recourt, 2018
- Amalda miriky Kantor, Castelin, Fedosov & Bouchet, 2020
- Amalda monilifera (Reeve, 1864)
- Amalda montrouzieri (Souverby, 1860)
- † Amalda morgani (R. S. Allan, 1926)
- Amalda mozambicana Rosado & Monteiro, 2023
- Amalda mucronata (G.B. Sowerby I, 1830)
- Amalda nitidanosum Ninomiya, 1991
- Amalda northlandica (Hart, 1995)
- Amalda novaezelandiae (G.B. Sowerby II, 1859)
- Amalda obesa (G.B. Sowerby II, 1859)
- Amalda oblonga (G.B. Sowerby I, 1830)
- † Amalda obsoleta (Brocchi, 1814)
- Amalda obtusa (Swainson, 1825)
- † Amalda olivula (Lamarck, 1803)
- † Amalda olsoni Beu, 1970
- † Amalda opima (Marwick, 1924)
- Amalda optima (G.B. Sowerby III, 1897)
- † Amalda oraria (Olson, 1956)
- Amalda ornata Ninomiya, 1988
- Amalda otohime Majima, Tsuchida & Oshima, 1993
- † Amalda ovalis Beu, 1970
- Amalda pacei Petuch, 1987
- † Amalda pakaurangiensis (Olson, 1956)
- Amalda parentalis Shikama & Oishi, 1977
- † Amalda patula (Bellardi, 1882)
- Amalda petterdi (Tate, 1893)
- Amalda pinguis Ninomiya, 1991
- † Amalda platycephala (Powell & Bartrum, 1929)
- † Amalda pliopenis Vera-Peláez, 2022
- Amalda ponderi Ninomiya, 1991
- † Amalda pristina (Olson, 1956)
- Amalda procera Ninomiya, 1991
- Amalda pullarium Ninomiya, 1991
- Amalda raoulensis Powell, 1967
- Amalda reevei (E.A. Smith, 1904)
- † Amalda rimuensis (Olson, 1956)
- † Amalda robusta (Marwick, 1924)
- Amalda roscoae Kilburn, 1975
- Amalda rottnestensis Ninomiya, 1991
- Amalda rubiginosa (Swainson, 1823)
- Amalda rubrofasciata Ninomiya, 1991
- † Amalda schmidti (Beets, 1984)
- Amalda scopuloceti Kilburn, 1993
- † Amalda semilaevis (Tenison Woods, 1879)
- Amalda similis (G.B. Sowerby II, 1859)
- Amalda sinensis (G.B. Sowerby II, 1859)
- Amalda soseitae Poppe & Tagaro, 2026
- Amalda southlandica (Fleming, 1948)
- † Amalda spinigera (P. Marshall, 1918)
- † Amalda stortha (Olson, 1956)
- † Amalda subampliata (Tate, 1889)
- † Amalda subgradata (Tate, 1889)
- † Amalda subulata (Lamarck, 1803)
- Amalda tankervillii (Swainson, 1825)
- Amalda telaaraneae Kilburn, 1993
- Amalda tenuis Ninomiya, 1991
- † Amalda tholiculus (Marwick, 1931)
- Amalda tindalli (Melvill, 1898)
- † Amalda tirangiensis (Marwick, 1926)
- Amalda trachyzonus Kilburn, 1975
- Amalda trippneri Kilburn, 1996
- Amalda turgida Ninomiya, 1990
- Amalda utopicaNinomiya, 1987
- Amalda venezuela Weisbord, 1962
- Amalda vernedei (G.B. Sowerby II, 1859)
- Amalda virginea Ninomiya, 1990
- † Amalda waikaiaensis (Finlay, 1926)
- † Amalda wairarapaensis (Olson, 1956)
- Amalda whatmoughi Kilburn, 1993

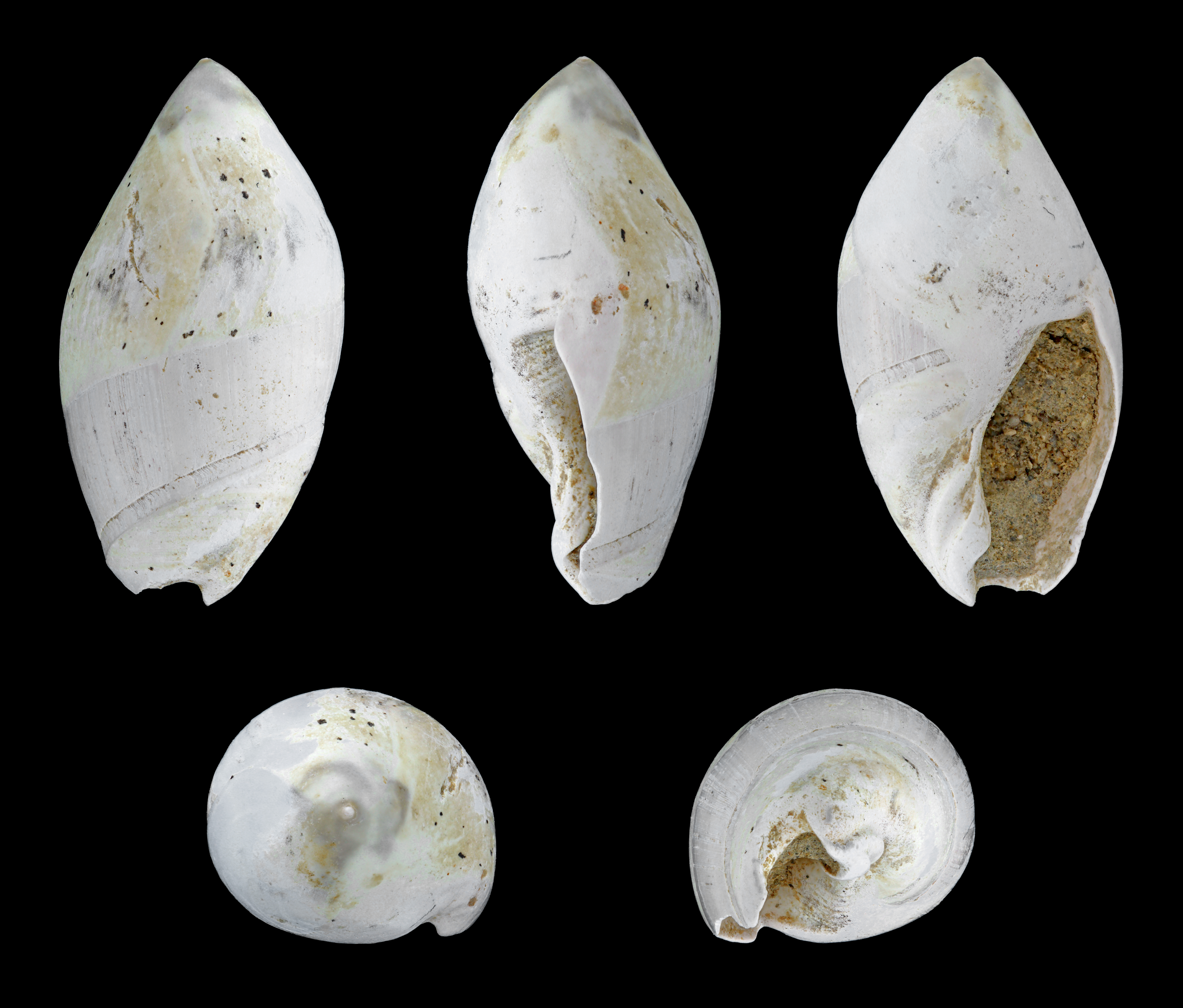
Amalda glandiformis (Lamarck, 1810), a fossil species from the Miocene of Austria

== Species brought into synonymy ==
- Amalda albicallosa [sic]: synonym of Amalda albocallosa (Lischke, 1873)
- Amalda ampla (Gmelin, 1791): synonym of Ancilla ampla (Gmelin, 1791)
- † Amalda buccinoides (Lamarck, 1803): synonym of † Spirancilla buccinoides (Lamarck, 1803)
- Amalda callifera Thiele, 1925: synonym of Amalda reevei (E.A. Smith, 1904)
- Amalda dyspetes (Iredale, 1924): synonym of Amalda marginata (Lamarck, 1811)
- Amalda elongata (Gray, 1874): synonym of Ancillista muscae (Pilsbry, 1926)
- Amalda errorum Tomlin, 1921: synonym of Amalda angustata (G.B. Sowerby II, 1859)
- Amalda fusiformis (Petterdi, 1886): synonym of Amalda petterdi (Tate, 1893) (invalid: not J. Sowerby, 1850)
- Amalda hayashi Ninomiya, 1988: synonym of Amalda rubiginosa (Swainson, 1823)
- Amalda lanceolata Ninomiya, 1991: synonym of Amalda petterdi (Tate, 1893) (junior subjective synonym)
- † Amalda lanceolata (Tate, 1889): synonym of † Baryspira lanceolata (Tate, 1889) (superseded combination)
- Amalda maritzae Bozzetti, 2007: synonym of Amalda allaryi Bozzetti, 2007 (uncertain synonym)
- Amalda procerum Ninomiya, 1991: synonym of Amalda procera Ninomiya, 1991
- Amalda siberutensis Thiele, 1925: synonym of Ancilla siberutensis Thiele, 1925
- Amalda sibuetae Kantor & Bouchet, 1999: synonym of Turrancilla sibuetae (Kantor & Bouchet, 1999) (original combination)
- Amalda sidneyensis Ninomiya, 1991: synonym of Amalda edithae (Pritchard & Gatliff, 1899) (junior subjective synonym)
- Amalda tankervillei (Swainson, 1825): synonym of Amalda tankervillii (Swainson, 1825)
- Amalda virgineus Ninomiya, 1990: synonym of Amalda virginea Ninomiya, 1990
- Amalda zeigleri Ninomiya, 1987: synonym of Amalda pacei Petuch, 1987
