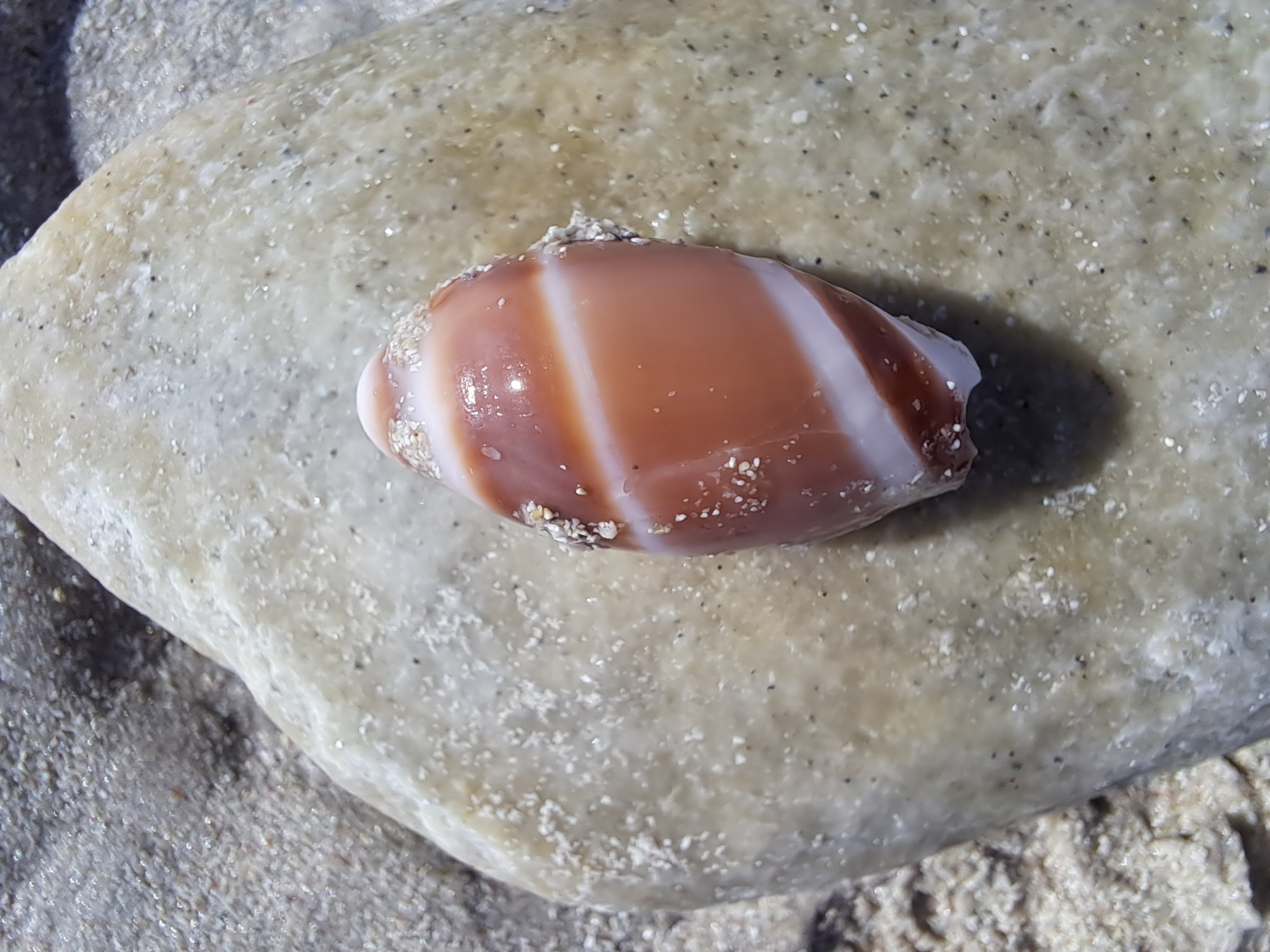

Scientific classification
- Kingdom: Animalia
- Phylum: Mollusca
- Class: Gastropoda
- Subclass: Caenogastropoda
- Order: Neogastropoda
- Family: Ancillariidae
- Genus: Amalda
- Species: A. obtusa

Binomial name
- Amalda obtusa (Swainson, 1825)

= Amalda obtusa =

Species of gastropod

Amalda obtusa is a species of sea snail, a marine gastropod mollusk in the family Ancillariidae.
