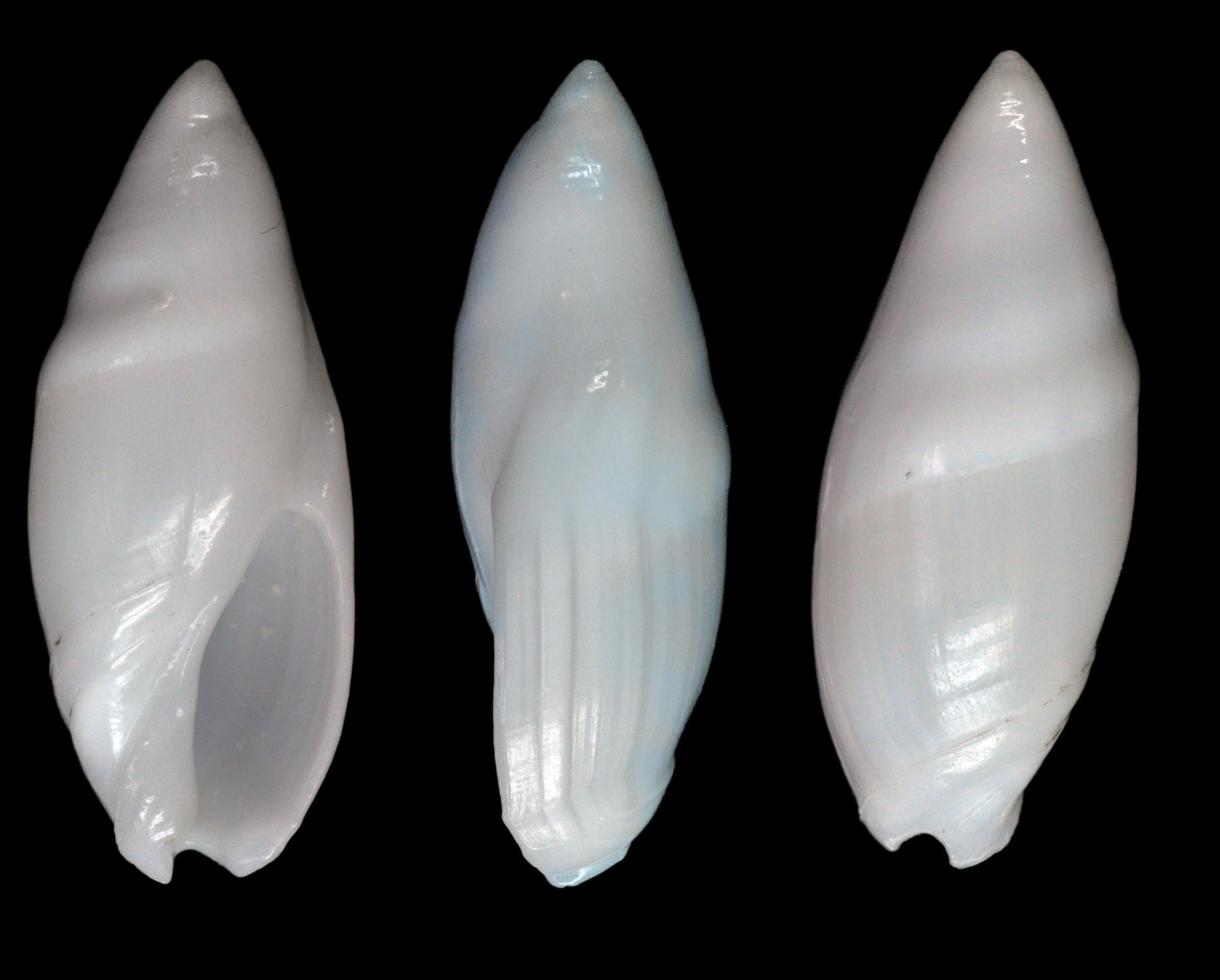
- Shell of Amalda alabaster (holotype at MNHN, Paris)

Scientific classification
- Kingdom: Animalia
- Phylum: Mollusca
- Class: Gastropoda
- Subclass: Caenogastropoda
- Order: Neogastropoda
- Family: Ancillariidae
- Genus: Amalda
- Species: A. alabaster

Binomial name
- Amalda alabaster Kantor, Castelin, Fedosov & Bouchet, 2020

= Amalda alabaster =

Species of gastropod

Amalda alabaster is a species of sea snail, a marine gastropod mollusk in the family Ancillariidae.

== Description ==
The length of the shell attains 26.7 mm, its diameter 13.5 mm.

The shell is small, reaching up to 27 mm in length, with an ovate fusiform shape. It features a low, broad conical spire and a small, dome-shaped protoconch, with the first whorl measuring approximately 0.8 mm in diameter. The primary callus is smooth and shallowly indented on the left side at the suture of the body whorl, while the secondary callus is faintly textured with a micro-shagreened surface. The olivoid groove is very shallow and barely noticeable. The anterior band is divided into upper and slightly broader lower bands by a distinct fasciolar ridge. The shell is uniformly white in color and is semitransparant.

== Distribution ==
This marine species is endemic to and occurs off south-eastern New Caledonia at depths between 180 m and 280 m.
