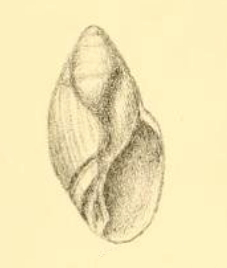
- Shell of Amalda decipiens (holotype)

Scientific classification
- Kingdom: Animalia
- Phylum: Mollusca
- Class: Gastropoda
- Subclass: Caenogastropoda
- Order: Neogastropoda
- Family: Ancillariidae
- Genus: Amalda
- Species: A. decipiens

Binomial name
- Amalda decipiens (G.B. Sowerby III, 1897)

Synonyms
- Ancilla decipiens G. B. Sowerby III, 1897 (original combination)

= Amalda decipiens =

Species of gastropod

Amalda decipiens, common name the spearhead ancilla, is a species of sea snail, a marine gastropod mollusk in the family Ancillariidae.

== Description ==
The length of the shell attains 28.3 mm, its diameter 15 mm.

(Original description in Latin) The shell is oblong-ovate, thick, and pale purplish, with dark bands on the anterior and posterior ends. The spire is moderately elevated and slightly blunt, consisting of six flatly convex whorls, covered by a thin callus. The polished callus is adorned with brown and tawny bands. The body whorl is gently convex and smoothly rounded. The columella is arched and thickened, with a purple hue, bordered at the top by a broad brown callus. The aperture is oblong-oval, with a deep purple interior.

== Distribution ==
This marine species occurs from Port Elizabeth, South Africa.
