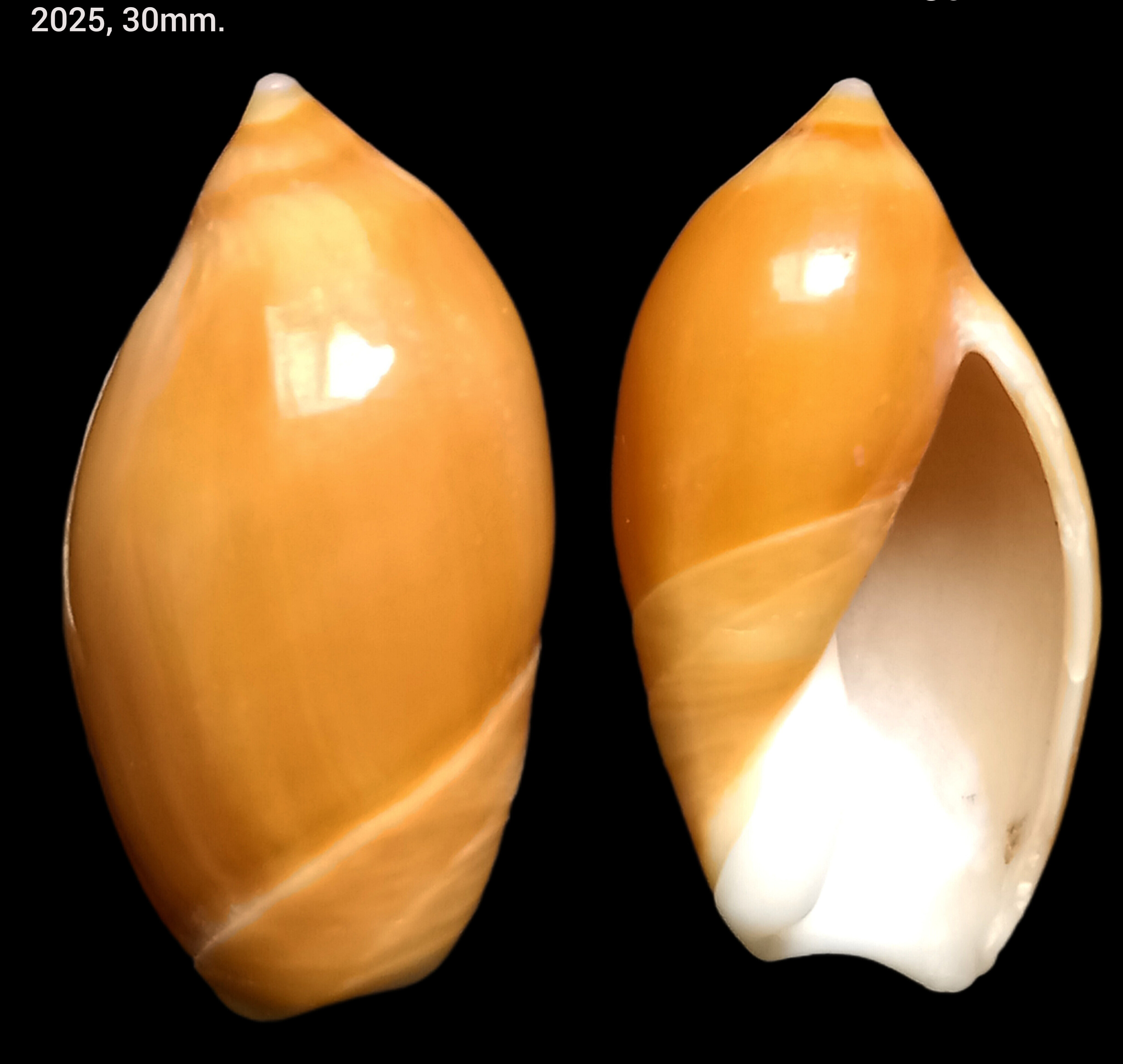
- Ancilla acuminata

Scientific classification
- Kingdom: Animalia
- Phylum: Mollusca
- Class: Gastropoda
- Subclass: Caenogastropoda
- Order: Neogastropoda
- Superfamily: Olivoidea
- Family: Ancillariidae
- Genus: Ancilla; Lamarck, 1799

Type species
- Voluta ampla Gmelin, 1801

Species
- See text

Synonyms
- Anaulax Roissy, 1805 (unnecessary substitute name for Ancilla); Ancilla (Chilotygma) H. Adams & A. Adams, 1853· accepted, alternate representation; Ancilla (Hesperancilla) Kilburn, 1981· accepted, alternate representation; † Ancilla (Javancilla) Kilburn, 1981 · accepted, alternate representation; Ancilla (Sparella) Gray, 1857· accepted, alternate representation; Ancilla (Sparellina) P. Fischer, 1883· accepted, alternate representation; Ancillaria Lamarck, 1811; Ancillus Montfort, 1810 invalid: unjustified emendation of Ancilla); Chilotygma H. Adams & A. Adams, 1853; Hesperancilla Kilburn, 1981· accepted, alternate representation; Sparella Gray, 1857 (original rank)

= Ancilla (gastropod) =

Ancilla Temporal range: Paleocene–Recent

Genus of gastropods

Ancilla, common name the ancillas, is a genus of sea snails, marine gastropod mollusks in the family Ancillariidae.

== Description ==
(Described as Chilotygma) The spire is moderate, the suture enamelled. The inner lip has the callus produced posteriorly into a strong angular tooth.

(Described as Anaulax) The shell is not polished. The spire is produced with sutures covered with a thick deposit of enamel. The inner lip has the callus extended, thick, and covering the spire.

(Described as Ancillaria) The shell is thin, ventricose and striated. The spire is short, obtuse with the suture enamelled. The aperture is wide.

(Described as Ancilla) The shell is oblong, subcylindrical and polished. The spire is short with the suture filled up with enamel. The aperture is large, dilated and effuse anteriorly. The twisted columella is callous anteriorly. The outer lip is thin, simple and acute.

== Species ==
Species within the genus Ancilla include:

- Ancilla acuminata (G.B. Sowerby II, 1859)
- Ancilla adelphe Kilburn, 1981
- Ancilla albisulcata (G.B. Sowerby I, 1830)
- Ancilla albozonata E.A. Smith, 1904
- Ancilla ampla (Gmelin, 1791)
- † Ancilla asphaltodes Beets, 1942
- Ancilla atimovatae Kantor, Fedosov, Puillandre & Bouchet, 2016
- † Ancilla austriaca (R. Hoernes, 1875)
- † Ancilla bandongensis (K. Martin, 1879)
- Ancilla boschi Kilburn, 1980
- Ancilla castanea (G.B. Sowerby I, 1830)
- Ancilla chrysoma Kilburn, 1981
- Ancilla cinnamomea Lamarck, 1801
- Ancilla culierei Cossignani & Quiquandon, 2019
- † Ancilla decipiens K. Martin, 1931
- Ancilla djiboutina (Jousseaume, 1894)
- Ancilla eburnea (Deshayes, 1830)
- † Ancilla elegantula (Tesch, 1915)
- Ancilla eloiseae T. Cossignani, 2023
- † Ancilla estebbunensis Vera-Peláez, 2022
- † Ancilla everwijni (K. Martin, 1884)
- Ancilla exigua (G.B. Sowerby I, 1830)
- Ancilla farsiana Kilburn, 1981
- Ancilla faustoi H.R. Matthews, H.C. Matthews & Muniz Dijck, 1979
- Ancilla giaquintoi Bozetti, 2006
- Ancilla guttata Boyer, 2015
- † Ancilla iberica (Landau & C. M. Silva, 2006)
- † Ancilla ickei K. Martin, 1914
- Ancilla inornata (E.A. Smith, 1879)
- Ancilla iota Kilburn, 1981
- † Ancilla javana (K. Martin, 1879)
- † Ancilla junghuhni (K. Martin, 1879)
- Ancilla kaviengensis Kantor, Fedosov, Puillandre & Bouchet, 2016
- † Ancilla latifasciata K. Martin, 1933
- Ancilla lhaumeti Kantor, Fedosov, Puillandre & Bouchet, 2016
- Ancilla lineolata (A. Adams, 1853)
- Ancilla marmorata (Reeve, 1864)
- † Ancilla martini (Tesch, 1915)
- Ancilla matthewsi Burch & Burch, 1967
- Ancilla minima Thiele, 1925
- Ancilla morandii Cossignani, 2019
- Ancilla morrisoni Kantor, Fedosov, Puillandre & Bouchet, 2016
- Ancilla murrayi Kilburn, 1981
- † Ancilla nitida (Wanner & Hahn, 1935)
- † Ancilla nonna K. Martin, 1914
- † Ancilla nuda (K. Martin, 1884)
- † Ancilla olsoni P. A. Maxwell, 1992
- Ancilla ordinaria E.A. Smith, 1906
- Ancilla ovalis (G.B. Sowerby II, 1859)
- † Ancilla paeteli K. Martin, 1914
- † Ancilla parvula (K. Martin, 1884)
- † Ancilla propinqua (Zittel, 1863)
- Ancilla pruinosa Boyer, 2015
- † Ancilla pusilla K. Martin, 1931
- † Ancilla rasa K. Martin, 1914
- † Ancilla rembangensis (K. Martin, 1906)
- Ancilla rouillardi Kilburn, 1981
- Ancilla sarda (Reeve, 1864)
- Ancilla scaphella (G.B. Sowerby II, 1859)
- Ancilla siberutensis Thiele, 1925
- † Ancilla songoensis K. Martin, 1914
- Ancilla sticta Kilburn, 1981
- Ancilla stranoi T. Cossignani, 2024
- † Ancilla stupaeformis Beets, 1942
- Ancilla sultana F. Boyer, 2015
- Ancilla taylori Kilburn, 1981
- † Ancilla teschi (Koperberg, 1931)
- Ancilla testudae (Kilburn, 1977)
- Ancilla thomassini Kilburn, 1981
- Ancilla tronsoni (G.B. Sowerby II, 1859)
- Ancilla undulata Boyer, 2015
- † Ancilla vegai Vera-Peláez, 2022
- Ancilla ventricosa (Lamarck, 1811)

== Synonyms ==
- Ancilla agulhasensis Thiele, 1925: synonym of Ancilla ordinaria E.A. Smith, 1906
- Ancilla alba Perry, 1811: synonym of Buccinanops vittatum (Linnaeus, 1767)
- Ancilla albocallosa (Lischke, 1873): synonym of Amalda albocallosa (Lischke, 1873)
- Ancilla alcocki E. A. Smith, 1906: synonym of Turrancilla alcocki (E. A. Smith, 1906)
- Ancilla aperta (G. B. Sowerby I, 1825): synonym of Anolacia aperta (G. B. Sowerby I, 1825)
- Ancilla aureocallosa (Kilburn & Jenner, 1977): synonym of Ancillista aureocallosa Kilburn & Jenner, 1977
- † Ancilla buccinoides Lamarck, 1803: synonym of † Spirancilla buccinoides (Lamarck, 1803) (superseded combination)
- † Ancilla canalifera Lamarck, 1803: synonym of † Ancillarina canalifera (Lamarck, 1803) (superseded combination)
- Ancilla cingulata (G. B. Sowerby I, 1830): synonym of Ancillista cingulata (G. B. Sowerby I, 1830)
- Ancilla coccinea Fischer, 1807: synonym of Ancilla cinnamomea Lamarck, 1801
- Ancilla coccinea Hedley, 1914: synonym of Amalda coccinata Kilburn, 1980
- Ancilla edgariana Schepman, 1911: synonym of Amalda edgariana (Schepman, 1911)
- Ancilla fasciata Reeve, 1864: synonym of Ancilla ordinaria E.A. Smith, 1906
- Ancilla lineata Perry, 1811: synonym of Nassarius glans glans (Linnaeus, 1758)
- Ancilla maculata Perry, 1811: synonym of Babylonia areolata (Link, 1807)
- Ancilla mauritiana G.B. Sowerby I, 1830: synonym of Anolacia mauritiana (G.B. Sowerby I, 1830)
- Ancilla muscae Pilsbry, 1926: synonym of Ancillista muscae (Pilsbry, 1926)
- Ancilla optima G.B. Sowerby III, 1897: synonym of Amalda optima (G.B. Sowerby III, 1897)
- Ancilla ordinaria major Turton, 1932: synonym of Ancilla albozonata E.A. Smith, 1904
- Ancilla oryza Reeve, 1864: synonym of Ancilla lineolata (A. Adams, 1853)
- Ancilla osculata Sowerby, 1900: synonym of Bullia osculata (Sowerby, 1900)
- Ancilla pallida Perry, 1811: synonym of Babylonia spirata (Linnaeus, 1758)
- Ancilla pura Sowerby, 1892: synonym of Ancilla marmorata (Reeve, 1864)
- Ancilla reboriae Poppe, Tagaro & Goto, 2018: synonym of Turrancilla reboriae (Poppe, Tagaro & Goto, 2018)
- Ancilla rubiginosa : synonym of Amalda rubiginosa (Swainson, 1823) (original combination)
- † Ancilla staminea (Conrad, 1832) : synonym of † Olivula staminea (Conrad, 1832)
- Ancilla suavis Yokoyama, 1926 : synonym of † Turrancilla suavis (Yokoyama, 1926) (superseded combination)
- Ancilla sumatrana Thiele, 1925: synonym of Ancillina sumatrana (Thiele, 1925)
