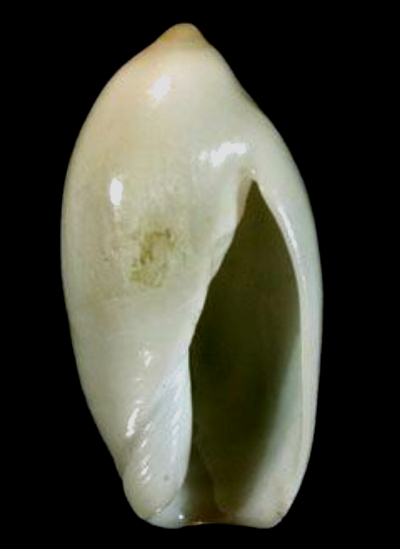
- Shell of Ancilla tronsoni (specimen at the Natural History Museum, Rotterdam)

Scientific classification
- Kingdom: Animalia
- Phylum: Mollusca
- Class: Gastropoda
- Subclass: Caenogastropoda
- Order: Neogastropoda
- Family: Ancillariidae
- Genus: Ancilla
- Species: A. tronsoni

Binomial name
- Ancilla tronsoni (G.B. Sowerby II, 1859)

Synonyms
- Ancilla (Sparella) tronsoni (G. B. Sowerby II, 1859); Ancillaria tronsoni G. B. Sowerby II, 1859 (original combination)

= Ancilla tronsoni =

Species of gastropod

Ancilla tronsoni is a species of sea snail, a marine gastropod mollusk in the family Ancillariidae.

== Description ==
The length of the shell attains 16 mm.

(Original description in Latin) The shell is suboval, very polished, and white. The spire is short. The aperture is elongated. The inferior suture is subcalloused, with a simple inferior band. The varix is short and striated, with a siphonal canal located behind the varix.

This species has a form that somewhat resembles Ancilla scaphella, yet approaches Ancilla ampla, but is distinguished by a much shorter varix than either.

== Distribution ==
This marine species occurs off Mozambique.
