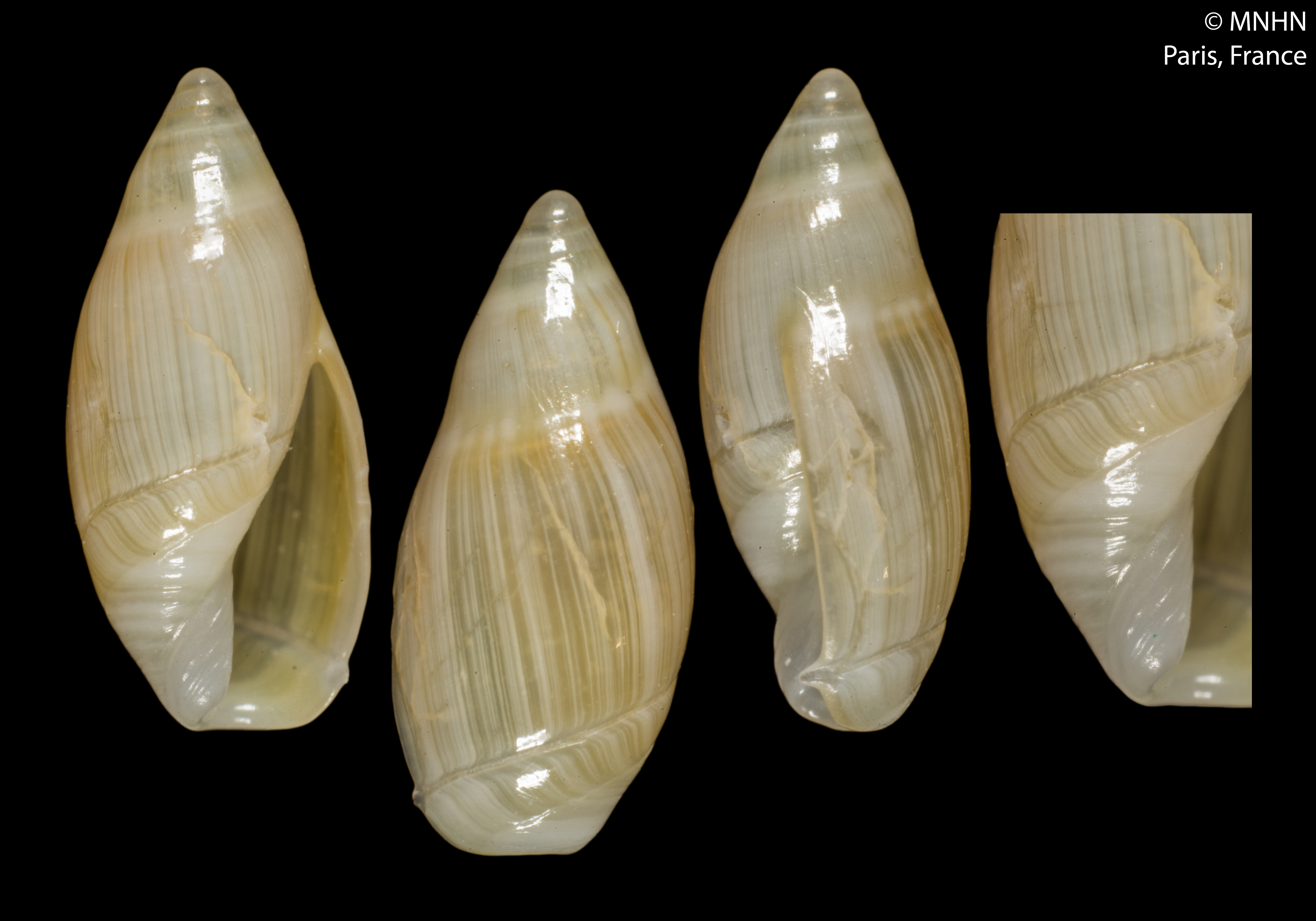
- Shell of Ancilla thomassini (holotype at MNHN, Paris)

Scientific classification
- Kingdom: Animalia
- Phylum: Mollusca
- Class: Gastropoda
- Subclass: Caenogastropoda
- Order: Neogastropoda
- Family: Ancillariidae
- Genus: Ancilla
- Species: A. thomassini

Binomial name
- Ancilla thomassini Kilburn, 1981

Synonyms
- Ancilla (Sparella) thomassini Kilburn, 1981· accepted, alternate representation

= Ancilla thomassini =

Species of gastropod

Ancilla thomassini is a species of sea snail, a marine gastropod mollusk in the family Ancillariidae, the olives and the likes.

== Distribution ==
This marine species occurs off Madagascar.
