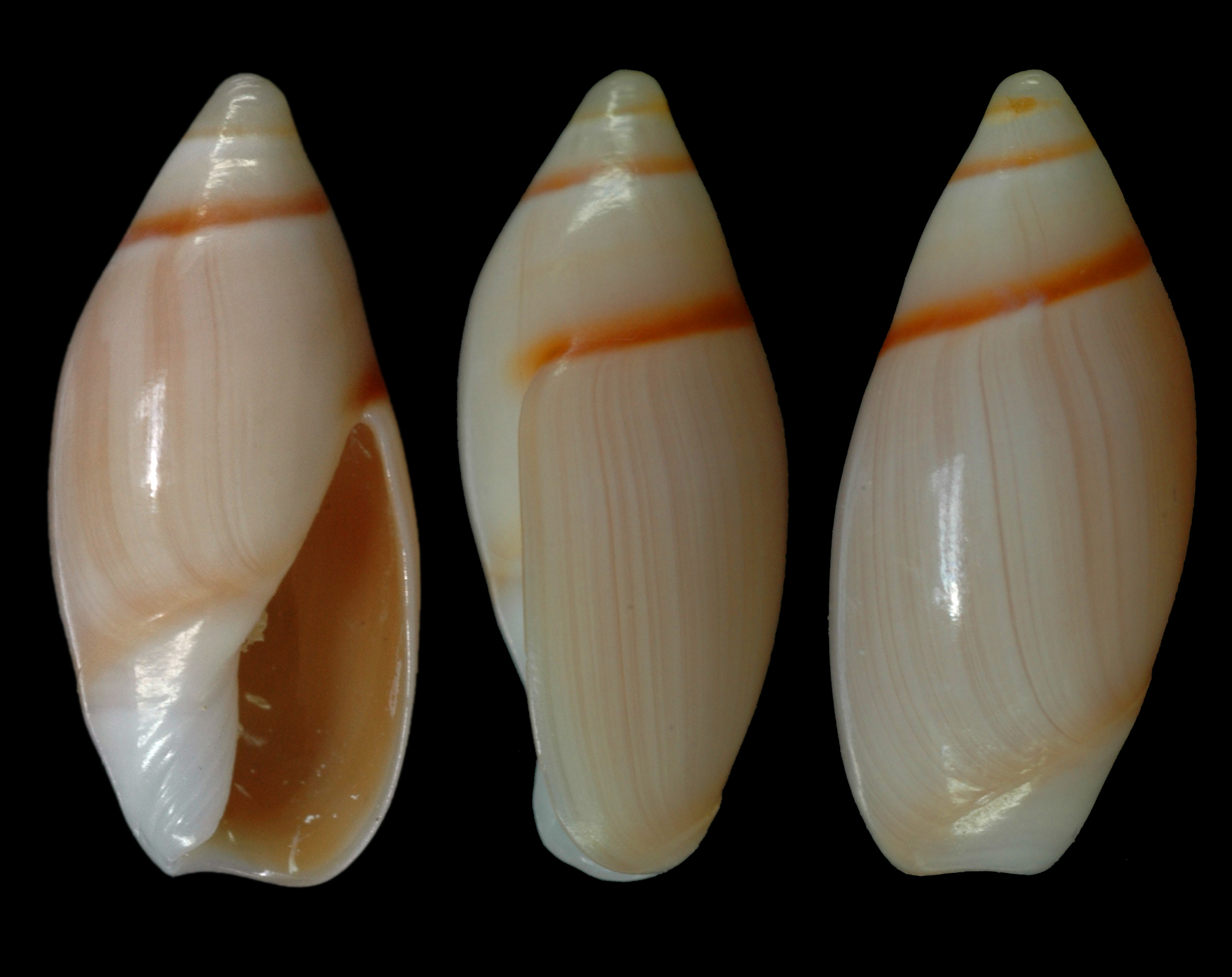
- Shell of Ancilla adelphe (specimen at MNHN, Paris)

Scientific classification
- Kingdom: Animalia
- Phylum: Mollusca
- Class: Gastropoda
- Subclass: Caenogastropoda
- Order: Neogastropoda
- Family: Ancillariidae
- Genus: Ancilla
- Species: A. adelphe

Binomial name
- Ancilla adelphe Kilburn, 1981

Synonyms
- Ancilla (Sparella) adelphe Kilburn, 1981· accepted, alternate representation

= Ancilla adelphe =

Species of gastropod

Ancilla adelphe is a species of sea snail, a marine gastropod mollusk in the family Ancillariidae, the olives.

== Description ==
Shell size 10 mm.

== Distribution ==
This marine species occurs off Madagascar, and off Seychelles.
