= Ancilla rouillardi =

Scientific classification
- Kingdom: Animalia
- Phylum: Mollusca
- Class: Gastropoda
- Subclass: Caenogastropoda
- Order: Neogastropoda
- Family: Ancillariidae
- Genus: Ancilla
- Species: A. rouillardi

Binomial name
- Ancilla rouillardi Kilburn, 1981

Synonyms
- Ancilla (Sparella) rouillardi Kilburn, 1981 · alternative representation; Sparella rouillardi (Kilburn, 1981)

Species of gastropod

Ancilla rouillardi is a species of sea snail, a marine gastropod mollusk in the family Ancillariidae.

== Description ==
The shell ranges in size from 30 mm to 35 mm.

== Distribution ==
South Mozambique: trawled at 100-150 meters.
