= Ancilla iota =

Scientific classification
- Kingdom: Animalia
- Phylum: Mollusca
- Class: Gastropoda
- Subclass: Caenogastropoda
- Order: Neogastropoda
- Family: Ancillariidae
- Genus: Ancilla
- Species: A. iota

Binomial name
- Ancilla iota Kilburn, 1981

Synonyms
- Ancilla (Chilotygma) iota Kilburn, 1981 alternative representation

Species of gastropod

Ancilla iota is a species of sea snail, a marine gastropod mollusk in the family Ancillariidae.

== Distribution ==
This marine species occurs in the Zanzibar Channel.
