= Turris faleiroi =

Scientific classification
- Kingdom: Animalia
- Phylum: Mollusca
- Class: Gastropoda
- Subclass: Caenogastropoda
- Order: Neogastropoda
- Family: Turridae
- Genus: Turris
- Species: T. faleiroi

Binomial name
- Turris faleiroi Kilburn, 1998

Species of gastropod

Turris faleiroi is a species of sea snail, a marine gastropod mollusk in the family Turridae, the turrids.

== Description ==
The length of the shell attains 41 mm.

== Distribution ==
This marine species occurs off Algoa Bay, South Africa.
