= Splendrillia skambos =

Scientific classification
- Kingdom: Animalia
- Phylum: Mollusca
- Class: Gastropoda
- Subclass: Caenogastropoda
- Order: Neogastropoda
- Superfamily: Conoidea
- Family: Drilliidae
- Genus: Splendrillia
- Species: S. skambos

Binomial name
- Splendrillia skambos Kilburn, 1988

Species of gastropod

Splendrillia skambos is a species of sea snail, a marine gastropod mollusk in the family Drilliidae.

== Description ==
The small, orange to yellowish, claviform shell has a length of 8.8 mm, its diameter 3.6 mm. The smooth protoconch is small (height about 0.8 mm) and consists of 1 2/3 whorls, the teleoconch contains 5 1/2 whorls. The axial ribs are strong (with 10-14 ribs on the penultimate whorl). The body whorl has not an inverted cone shape and its dorsum is not prominently humped and is without a distinct varix. The rostrum is not thick. The short siphonal canal is relatively wide and twisted slightly to the right. The aperture is narrowly pear-shaped. The outer lip is not flattened in the middle. The columella is convex and its base is curved to the left.

== Distribution ==
This marine species occurs off the upper continental slope of Transkei, South Africa.
