= Nassarius lawsonorum =

Scientific classification
- Kingdom: Animalia
- Phylum: Mollusca
- Class: Gastropoda
- Subclass: Caenogastropoda
- Order: Neogastropoda
- Family: Nassariidae
- Genus: Nassarius
- Species: N. lawsonorum

Binomial name
- Nassarius lawsonorum Kilburn, 2000

Synonyms
- Nassarius (Hima) lawsonorum Kilburn, 2000

Species of gastropod

Nassarius lawsonorum is a species of sea snail, a marine gastropod mollusk in the family Nassariidae, the Nassa mud snails or dog whelks.

== Distribution ==
This species occurs in the Indian Ocean off Mozambique and South Africa.
