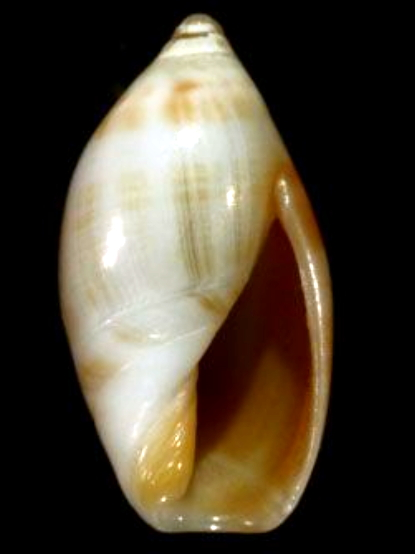
- Shell of Ancilla ovalis (specimen at the Natural History Museum, Rotterdam)

Scientific classification
- Kingdom: Animalia
- Phylum: Mollusca
- Class: Gastropoda
- Subclass: Caenogastropoda
- Order: Neogastropoda
- Family: Ancillariidae
- Genus: Ancilla
- Species: A. ovalis

Binomial name
- Ancilla ovalis (G.B. Sowerby II, 1859)

= Ancilla ovalis =

Species of gastropod

Ancilla ovalis is a species of sea snail, a marine gastropod mollusk in the family Ancillariidae.

== Description ==
The length of the shell attains 10 mm.

The shell is oval, white, and ventricose. The spire is produced. The aperture is rather short and unidentate (one-toothed) anteriorly. The columellar varix is small and sulcate, with the inferior band indistinct.

Reminiscent of Ancilla castanea, this small, white, and ventricose shell differs in having a much shorter aperture and a very small varix, while its basal belt remains indistinct.

== Distribution ==
This marine species occurs off Oman.
