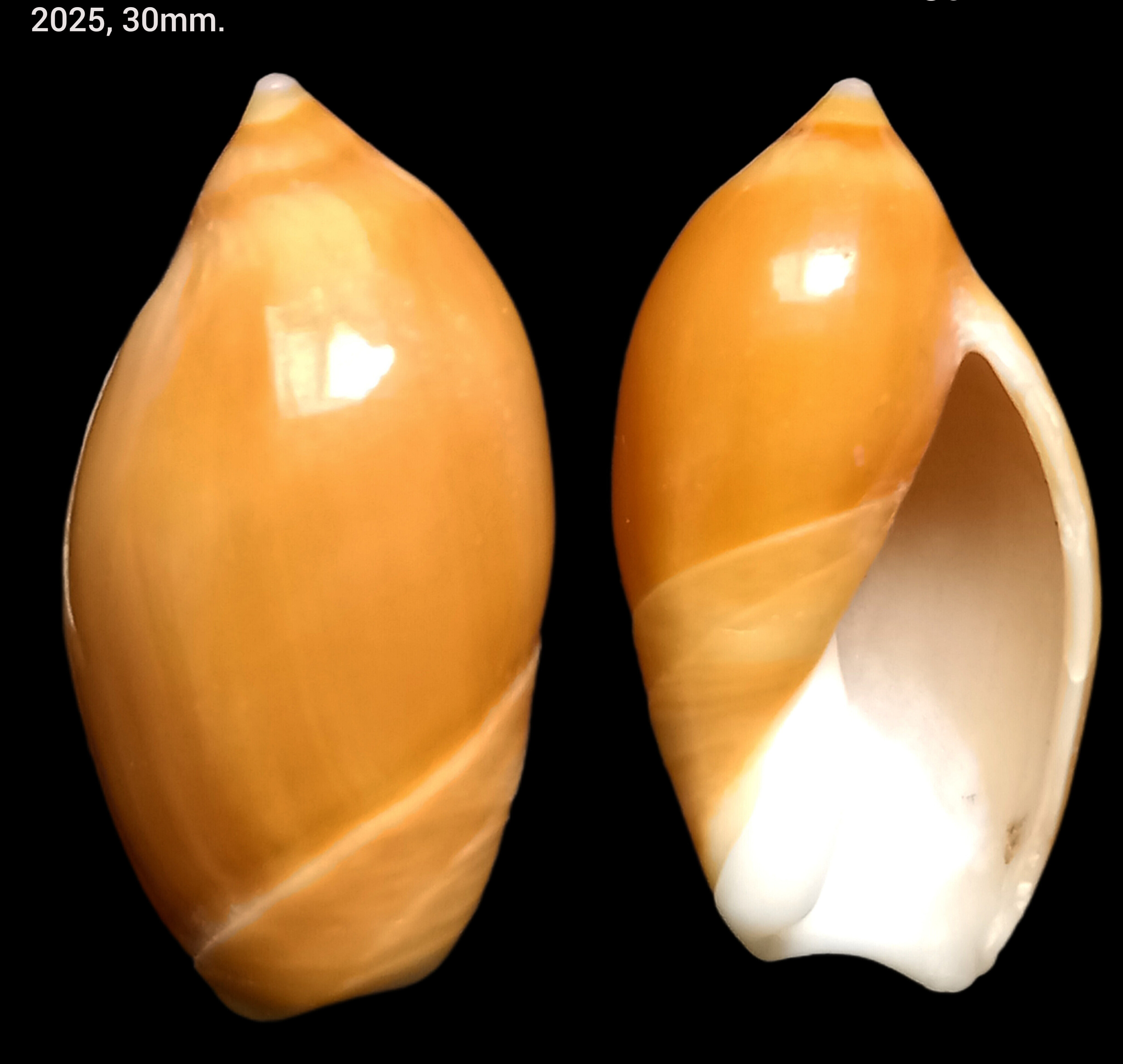
- Ancilla acuminata

Scientific classification
- Kingdom: Animalia
- Phylum: Mollusca
- Class: Gastropoda
- Subclass: Caenogastropoda
- Order: Neogastropoda
- Family: Ancillariidae
- Genus: Ancilla
- Species: A. acuminata

Binomial name
- Ancilla acuminata (G.B. Sowerby II, 1859)

Synonyms
- Ancilla (Sparellina) acuminata (G. B. Sowerby II, 1859) alternative representation; Ancillaria acuminata G. B. Sowerby II, 1859 (original combination)

= Ancilla acuminata =

Species of gastropod

Ancilla acuminata is a species of sea snail, a marine gastropod mollusk in the family Ancillariidae.

== Description ==
(Original description in Latin) The shell is elongated, cinnamon-colored or white, and faintly tawny internally. The spire is exserted and acuminated. The suture is calloused. The body whorl is subangulate. The inferior suture is white, with a simple, chestnut inferior band. The varix is thick, tortuous, and striated. The aperture is oblong and unidentate (one-toothed) below.

An angle in the body whorl imparts a pyramidal form to the spire, which is also characterized by a slight rising around the whorls at the suture. The sides of the shell are rather straight. In other respects, it resembles the more acuminated specimens of Ancilla albisulcata.

== Distribution ==
This species occurs in the Red Sea; also off Eritrea, Madagascar, Tanzania, Seychelles, India.
