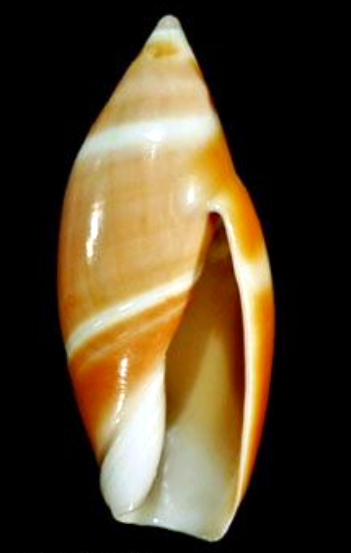
- Shell of Ancilla boschi (specimen at the Natural History Museum, Rotterdam)

Scientific classification
- Kingdom: Animalia
- Phylum: Mollusca
- Class: Gastropoda
- Subclass: Caenogastropoda
- Order: Neogastropoda
- Family: Ancillariidae
- Genus: Ancilla
- Species: A. boschi

Binomial name
- Ancilla boschi Kilburn, 1980

Synonyms
- Ancilla (Sparella) boschi Kilburn, 1980 alternative representation

= Ancilla boschi =

Species of gastropod

Ancilla boschi is a species of sea snail, a marine gastropod mollusk in the family Ancillariidae.

== Description ==
The length of the shell attains 25 mm.

== Distribution ==
This marine species occurs off Oman.
