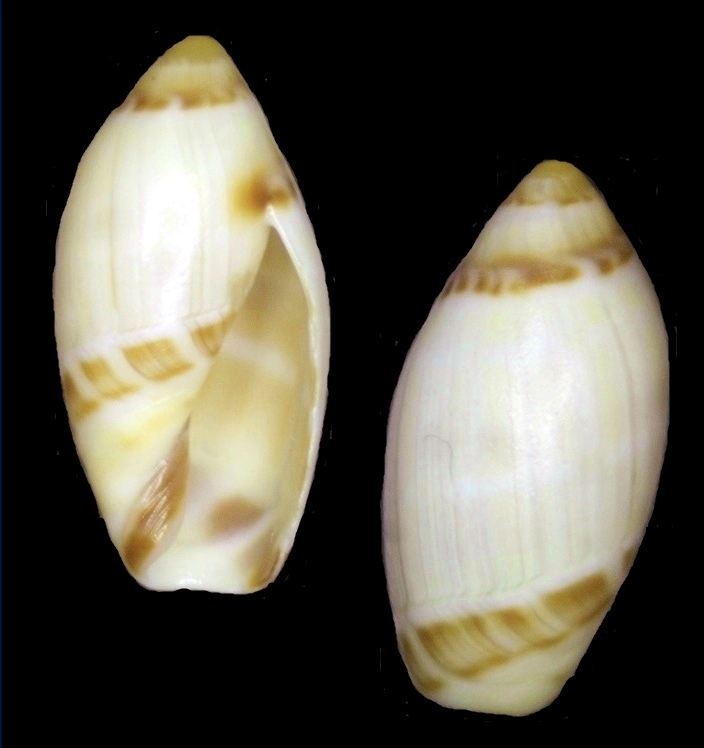
- Shell of Ancilla ordinaria

Scientific classification
- Kingdom: Animalia
- Phylum: Mollusca
- Class: Gastropoda
- Subclass: Caenogastropoda
- Order: Neogastropoda
- Family: Ancillariidae
- Genus: Ancilla
- Species: A. ordinaria

Binomial name
- Ancilla ordinaria E.A. Smith, 1906

Synonyms
- Ancilla (Sparella) fasciata (Reeve, 1864) junior homonym; Ancilla (Sparella) ordinaria E. A. Smith, 1906 alternative representation; Ancilla agulhasensis Thiele, J., 1925; Ancilla fasciata Reeve, 1864; Ancillaria fasciata Reeve, 1864 junior homonym (invalid: junior secondary homonym...); Sparella ordinaria (E. A. Smith, 1906)

= Ancilla ordinaria =

Species of gastropod

Ancilla ordinaria, the white-banded ancilla, is a species of sea snail, a marine gastropod mollusk in the family Ancillariidae.

Variety

- Ancilla ordinaria var. major W. H. Turton, 1932: synonym of Ancilla albozonata E. A. Smith, 1904 (junior synonym)

== Description ==
The shell size varies between 8 mm and 21 mm.

(Original description in Latin) This is a small, sub-ovate shell that is pointed above. It has a pale yellowish color, and is adorned with stripes or lines, which are faint, slightly oblique, and obscure; sometimes it is entirely snow-white. It has 4-5 whorls that increase rapidly in size. The spire is short and obtuse at the apex. The body whorl is bisulcate (has two grooves) at the front, with the upper groove forming an inconspicuous tooth above the lip, and terminating at the other end at the upper part of the aperture. The lip is thickened and curved above, with a slight incision at its insertion. The columella is callous and reflected at the front and slightly grooved.

== Distribution ==
This marine species is distributed in the Indian Ocean off South Africa (Port Alfred) and Mozambique
