= A. cinnamomea =

A. cinnamomea may refer to:

- Aglaia cinnamomea, a plant species found in Indonesia and Papua New Guinea
- Ancilla cinnamomea, a sea snail species

== See also ==
- Cinnamomea (disambiguation)
