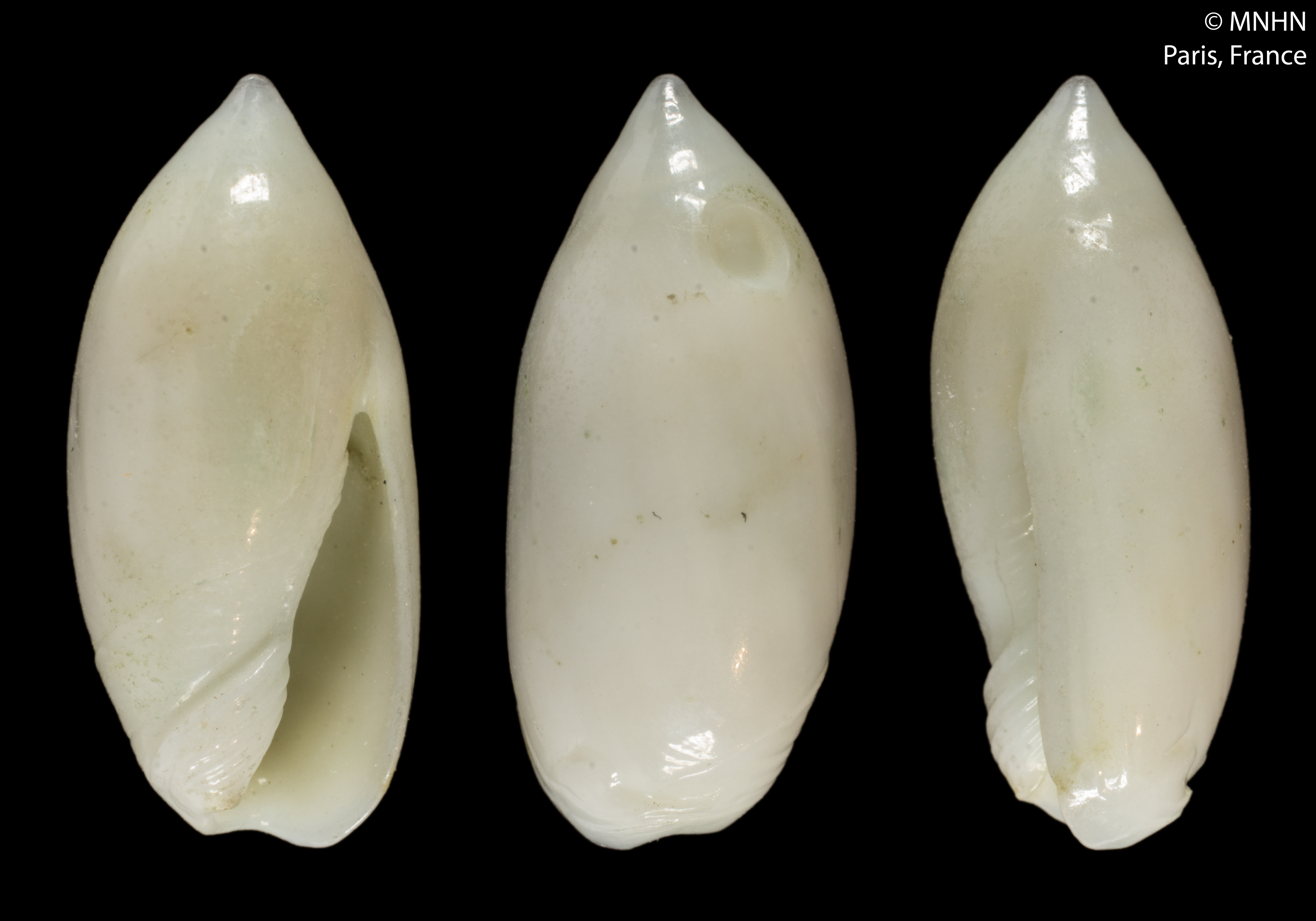
- Ancilla testudae

Scientific classification
- Kingdom: Animalia
- Phylum: Mollusca
- Class: Gastropoda
- Subclass: Caenogastropoda
- Order: Neogastropoda
- Family: Ancillariidae
- Genus: Ancilla
- Species: A. testudae

Binomial name
- Ancilla testudae (Kilburn, 1977)

Synonyms
- Ancilla (Chilotygma) testudae (Kilburn, 1977)· accepted, alternate representation; Chilotygma testudae Kilburn, 1977 (original combination)

= Ancilla testudae =

Species of gastropod

Ancilla testudae is a species of sea snail, a marine gastropod mollusk in the family Ancillariidae, the olives and the likes.

== Description ==
The length of the shell attains 12mm.

== Distribution ==
This marine species occurs in the Gulf of Aden off Djibouti.
