= Ancilla taylori =

Scientific classification
- Kingdom: Animalia
- Phylum: Mollusca
- Class: Gastropoda
- Subclass: Caenogastropoda
- Order: Neogastropoda
- Family: Ancillariidae
- Genus: Ancilla
- Species: A. taylori

Binomial name
- Ancilla taylori Kilburn, 1981

Species of gastropod

Ancilla taylori is a species of sea snail, a marine gastropod mollusk in the family Ancillariidae.

== Distribution ==
This marine species occurs in the waters off Sabah and off the Philippines.
