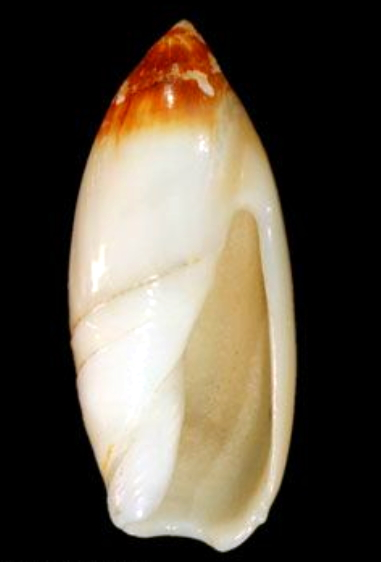
- Shell of Ancilla farsiana (specimen at the Natural History Museum, Rotterdam)

Scientific classification
- Kingdom: Animalia
- Phylum: Mollusca
- Class: Gastropoda
- Subclass: Caenogastropoda
- Order: Neogastropoda
- Family: Ancillariidae
- Genus: Ancilla
- Species: A. farsiana

Binomial name
- Ancilla farsiana Kilburn, 1981

Synonyms
- Ancilla (Sparella) farsiana Kilburn, 1981 alternative representation

= Ancilla farsiana =

Species of gastropod

Ancilla farsiana is a species of sea snail, a marine gastropod mollusk in the family Ancillariidae.

== Description ==
The shell reaches a length of 23 mm.

== Distribution ==
This marine species occurs in the waters off Oman, Iran, and India.
