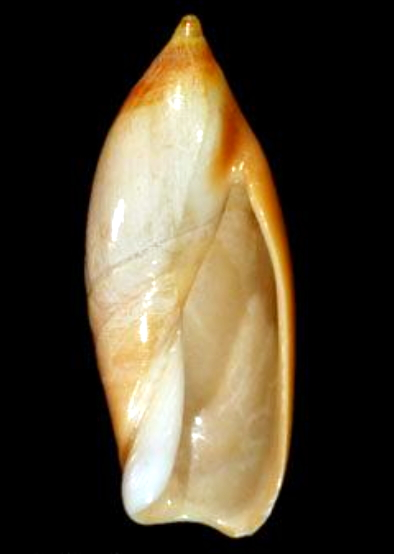
- Shell of Ancilla chrysoma (specimen at the Natural History Museum, Rotterdam)

Scientific classification
- Kingdom: Animalia
- Phylum: Mollusca
- Class: Gastropoda
- Subclass: Caenogastropoda
- Order: Neogastropoda
- Family: Ancillariidae
- Genus: Ancilla
- Species: A. chrysoma

Binomial name
- Ancilla chrysoma Kilburn, 1981

= Ancilla chrysoma =

Species of gastropod

Ancilla chrysoma is a species of sea snail, a marine gastropod mollusk in the family Ancillariidae.

== Description ==
The length of the shell attains 27 mm.

== Distribution ==
This marine species occurs off India.
