= Ancilla sticta =

Scientific classification
- Kingdom: Animalia
- Phylum: Mollusca
- Class: Gastropoda
- Subclass: Caenogastropoda
- Order: Neogastropoda
- Family: Ancillariidae
- Genus: Ancilla
- Species: A. sticta

Binomial name
- Ancilla sticta Kilburn, 1981

Species of gastropod

Ancilla sticta is a species of sea snail, a marine gastropod mollusk in the family Ancillariidae.

== Distribution ==
This marine species is found in the Gulf of Aden.
