= Splendrillia hayesi =

Scientific classification
- Kingdom: Animalia
- Phylum: Mollusca
- Class: Gastropoda
- Subclass: Caenogastropoda
- Order: Neogastropoda
- Superfamily: Conoidea
- Family: Drilliidae
- Genus: Splendrillia
- Species: S. hayesi

Binomial name
- Splendrillia hayesi Kilburn, 1988

Species of gastropod

Splendrillia hayesi is a species of sea snail, a marine gastropod mollusk in the family Drilliidae.

== Distribution ==
This marine species occurs in the demersal zone off Algoa Bay, South Africa.
