= Ancilla murrayi =

Scientific classification
- Kingdom: Animalia
- Phylum: Mollusca
- Class: Gastropoda
- Subclass: Caenogastropoda
- Order: Neogastropoda
- Family: Ancillariidae
- Genus: Ancilla
- Species: A. murrayi

Binomial name
- Ancilla murrayi Kilburn, 1981

Species of gastropod

Ancilla murrayi is a species of sea snail, a marine gastropod mollusk in the family Ancillariidae.

== Description ==
The shell ranges in length from 10 mm to 15 mm.

== Distribution ==
This species occurs in the Indian Ocean: east coast of Africa: Mozambique to Tanzania.
