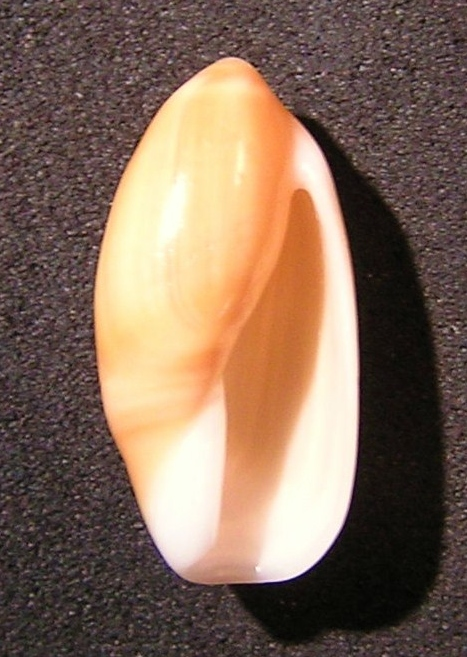
- Apertural view of a shell of Ancilla giaquintoi

Scientific classification
- Kingdom: Animalia
- Phylum: Mollusca
- Class: Gastropoda
- Subclass: Caenogastropoda
- Order: Neogastropoda
- Family: Ancillariidae
- Genus: Ancilla
- Species: A. giaquintoi

Binomial name
- Ancilla giaquintoi Bozetti, 2006

Synonyms
- Ancilla (Sparella) giaquintoi Bozetti, 2006

= Ancilla giaquintoi =

Species of gastropod

Ancilla giaquintoi is a species of sea snail, a marine gastropod mollusk in the family Ancillariidae, the olives and the like.

== Description ==
The length of the shell can vary between 15 mm and 22 mm.

== Distribution ==
This species occurs in the Indian Ocean off Somalia and Madagascar.
