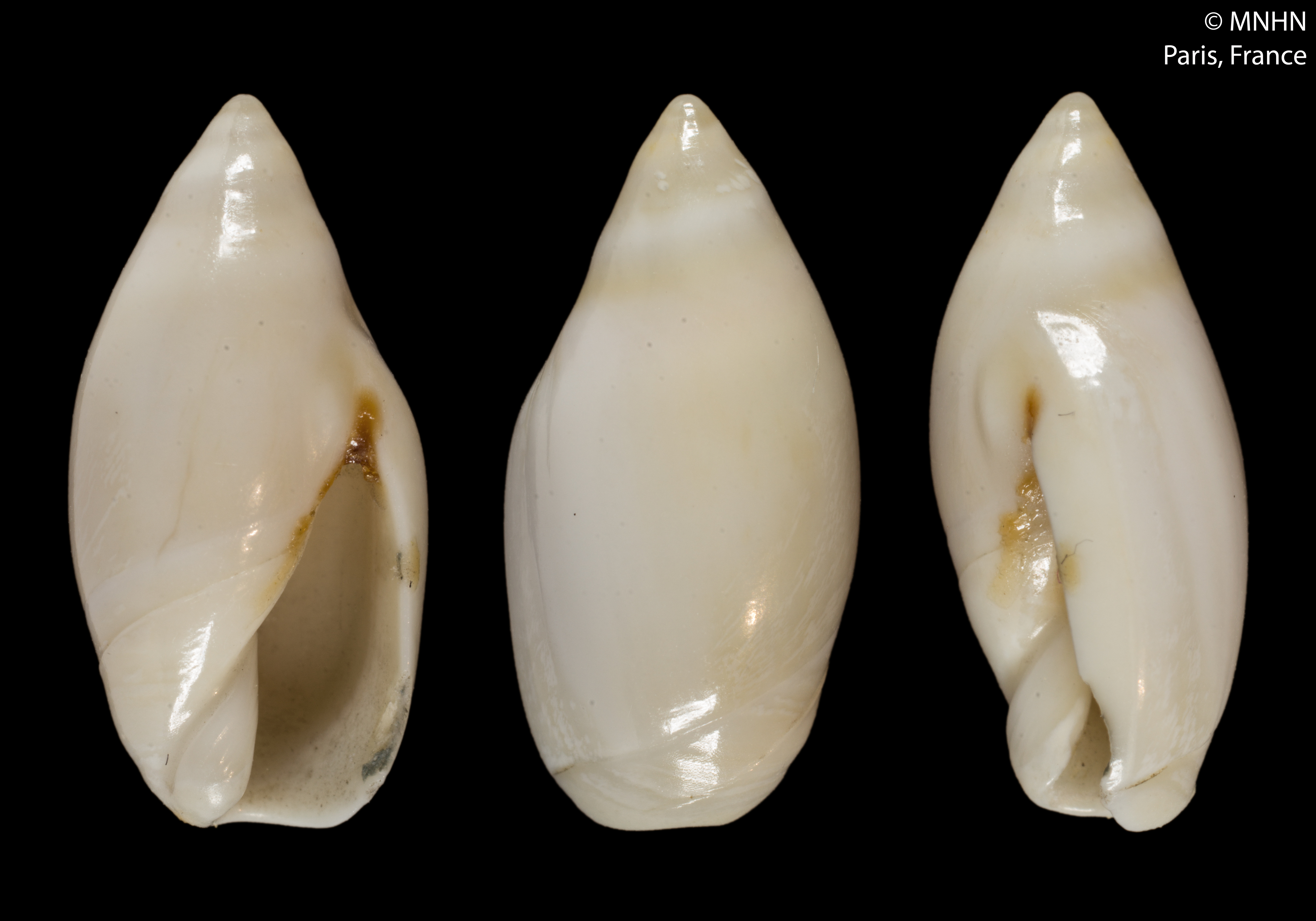
- Shell of Ancilla eburnea (syntype at MNHN, Paris)

Scientific classification
- Kingdom: Animalia
- Phylum: Mollusca
- Class: Gastropoda
- Subclass: Caenogastropoda
- Order: Neogastropoda
- Family: Ancillariidae
- Genus: Ancilla
- Species: A. eburnea

Binomial name
- Ancilla eburnea (Deshayes, 1830)

Synonyms
- Ancilla (Sparellina) eburnea (Deshayes, 1830)· accepted, alternate representation; Ancilla eburnea striolata (G. B. Sowerby II, 1859); Ancillaria crassa G. B. Sowerby II, 1859; Ancillaria eburnea Deshayes, 1830 (original combination); Ancillaria striolata G. B. Sowerby II, 1859

= Ancilla eburnea =

Species of gastropod

Ancilla eburnea is a species of sea snail, a marine gastropod mollusk in the family Ancillariidae, the olives.

== Description ==
The shell attains a length of 17 mm.

(Original description in French) This small shell is ivory-white, with a yellowish tint. It is oval in shape and pointed at the apex, with its spire whorls fused together. The shell is entirely smooth. At its base, a narrow, depressed double furrow leads obliquely to the angle of the right margin, where it forms a small, rather prominent denticle.

The spire is elongated, while the aperture is quite short and narrow, only slightly flared at the base. The columellar fold is a brighter white, small, and striated. A calcareous deposit can be seen on the columella at the posterior angle of the aperture. The interior of the shell is a very pale tawny color.

== Distribution ==
This species occurs in the Red Sea and off Yemen.
