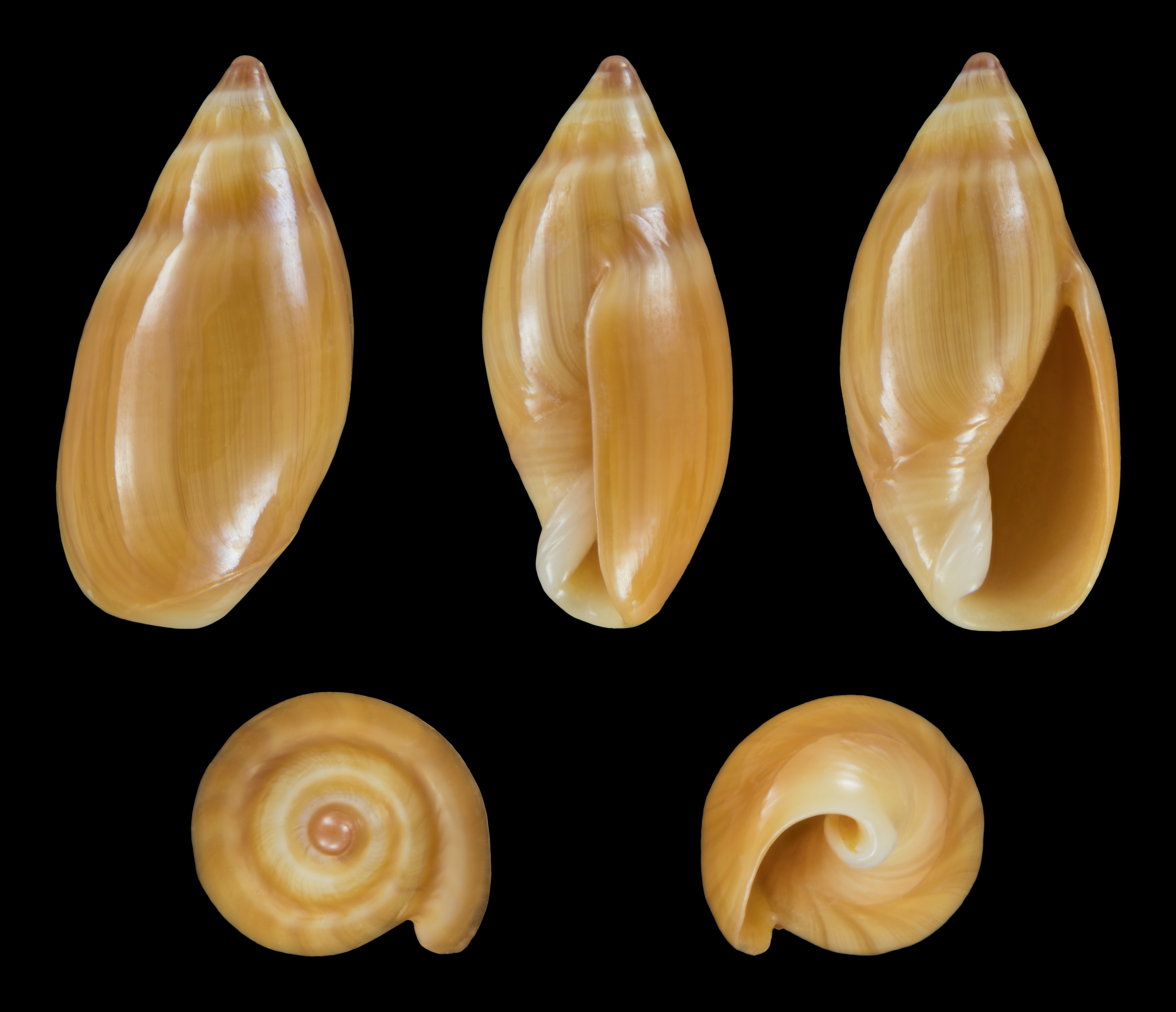
- Ancilla sarda

Scientific classification
- Kingdom: Animalia
- Phylum: Mollusca
- Class: Gastropoda
- Subclass: Caenogastropoda
- Order: Neogastropoda
- Family: Ancillariidae
- Genus: Ancilla
- Species: A. sarda

Binomial name
- Ancilla sarda (Reeve, 1864)

Synonyms
- Ancilla (Sparella) sarda (Reeve, 1864) alternative representation; Ancillaria sarda Reeve, 1864 (original combination)

= Ancilla sarda =

Species of gastropod

Ancilla sarda, common name the cornelian ancillaria, is a species of sea snail, a marine gastropod mollusk in the family Ancillariidae.

== Description ==
The shell reaches a length of 14 mm.

(Original description) The shell is stoutly ovate, a shining reddish-yellow, and obscurely white-banded at the spire. The spire is conical, and the whorls are tumidly convex. The columella is constricted and twisted, with an ivory-white color.

== Distribution ==
This species occurs in the Indian Ocean off the Seychelles.
