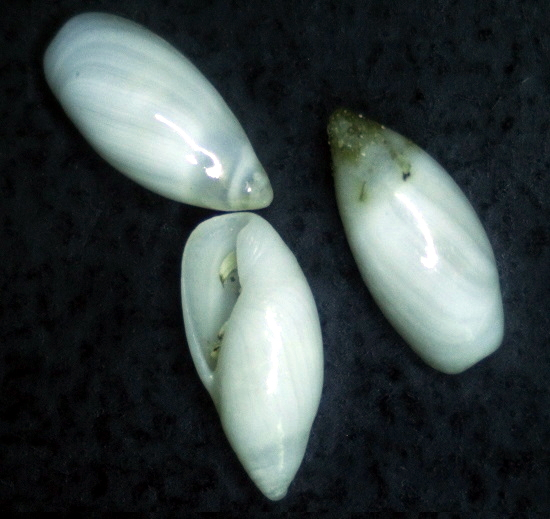
- Shell of Ancilla minima

Scientific classification
- Kingdom: Animalia
- Phylum: Mollusca
- Class: Gastropoda
- Subclass: Caenogastropoda
- Order: Neogastropoda
- Family: Ancillariidae
- Genus: Ancilla
- Species: A. minima

Binomial name
- Ancilla minima Thiele, 1925

Synonyms
- Ancilla (Chilotygma) minima Thiele, 1925 alternative representation; Chilotygma minima (Thiele, 1925)

= Ancilla minima =

Species of gastropod

Ancilla minima is a species of sea snail, a marine gastropod mollusk in the family Ancillariidae.

== Distribution ==
This marine species occurs off Tanzania.
