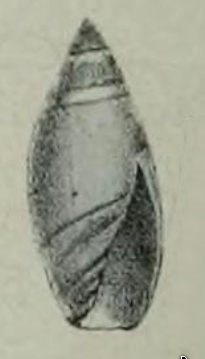
- Shell of Ancilla inornata (holotype)

Scientific classification
- Kingdom: Animalia
- Phylum: Mollusca
- Class: Gastropoda
- Subclass: Caenogastropoda
- Order: Neogastropoda
- Family: Ancillariidae
- Genus: Ancilla
- Species: A. inornata

Binomial name
- Ancilla inornata (E.A. Smith, 1879)

Synonyms
- Ancillaria inornata E. A. Smith, 1879 (original combination)

= Ancilla inornata =

Species of gastropod

Ancilla inornata is a species of sea snail, a marine gastropod mollusk in the family Ancillariidae.

== Description ==
The length of the shell attains 8 mm, its diameter 3 mm.

(Original description) The shell is elongate and acuminately ovate, with a white base faintly tinged with yellow above the suture. It has four whorls coated in a thin enamel. The spire is moderately acute at its apex with slightly convex outlines. The body whorl is indistinctly striated, with two narrow, oblique grooves (sulci) on its lower part. The upper of these grooves is deeper and borders the basal band (balteus). The whorl's extremity is deeply grooved, with three or four oblique folds (plicae) between the grooves. The aperture makes up slightly more than half of the shell's total length, and the basal notch is broad and shallow.

== Distribution ==
This marine species occurs off Japan.
