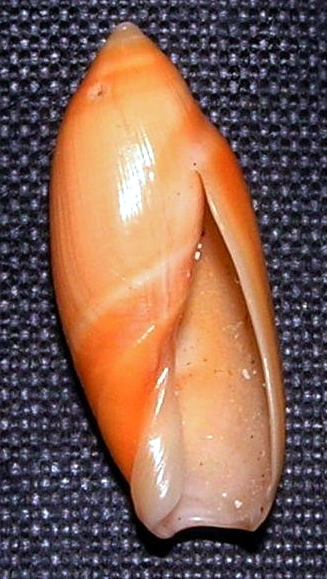
- Shell of Ancilla faustoi

Scientific classification
- Kingdom: Animalia
- Phylum: Mollusca
- Class: Gastropoda
- Subclass: Caenogastropoda
- Order: Neogastropoda
- Family: Ancillariidae
- Genus: Ancilla
- Species: A. faustoi

Binomial name
- Ancilla faustoi H.R. Matthews, H.C. Matthews & Muniz Dijck, 1979

= Ancilla faustoi =

Species of gastropod

Ancilla faustoi is a species of sea snail, a marine gastropod mollusk in the family Ancillariidae.

== Description ==
Shell size 15–20 mm.

== Distribution ==
Western Atlantic Ocean: Espírito Santo, Brazil at 25–30 meters depth, on sand.
