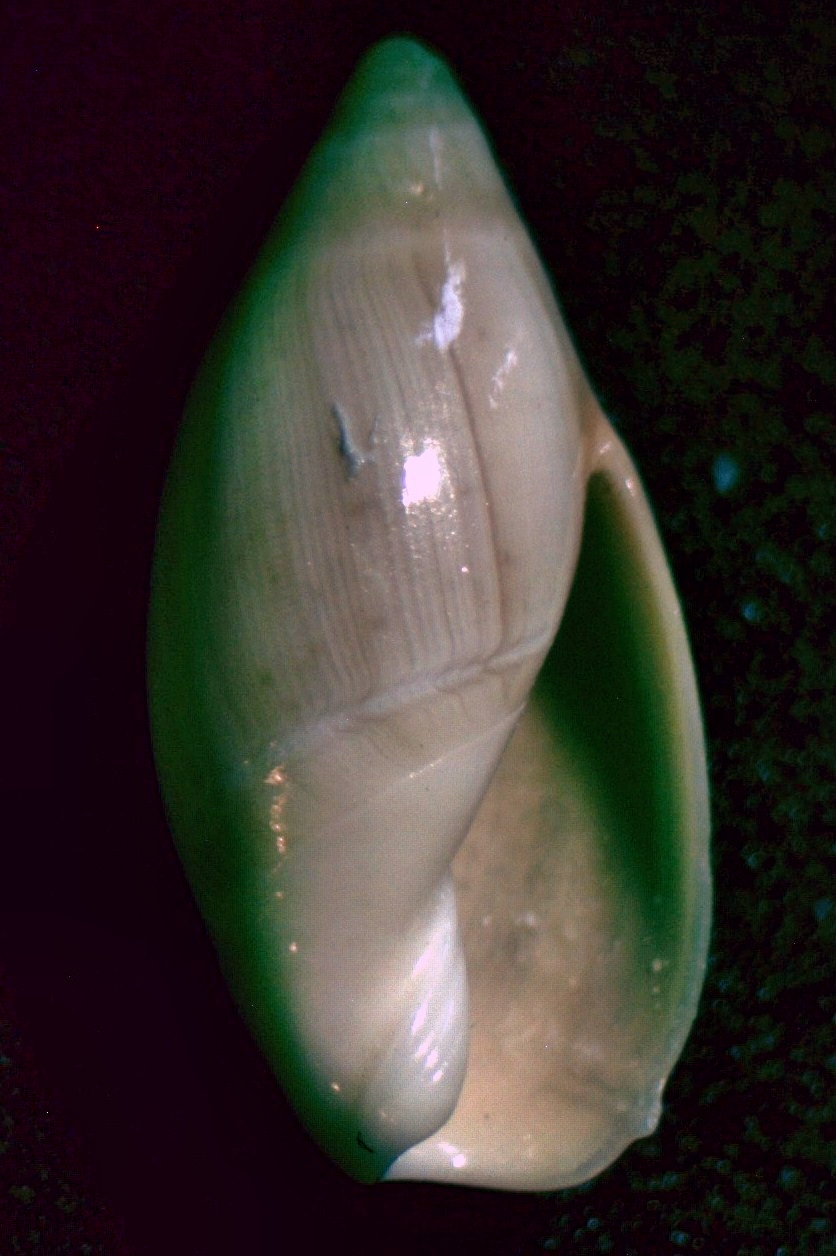
- Apertural view of a shell of Ancilla lineolata

Scientific classification
- Kingdom: Animalia
- Phylum: Mollusca
- Class: Gastropoda
- Subclass: Caenogastropoda
- Order: Neogastropoda
- Family: Ancillariidae
- Genus: Ancilla
- Species: A. lineolata

Binomial name
- Ancilla lineolata (A. Adams, 1853)

Synonyms
- Ancilla oryza Reeve, 1864; Ancilla (Sparellina) lineolata (A. Adams, 1853); Ancillaria lineolata A. Adams, 1851 (basionym)

= Ancilla lineolata =

Species of gastropod

Ancilla lineolata is a species of sea snail, a marine gastropod mollusk in the family Ancillariidae.

== Description ==
The shell grows to a length of 15 mm.

(Original description in Latin) This ovate-fusiform shell has a short, slightly pointed spire. The spire is a pale tawny color, marked by distinct white sutures and dense, brown longitudinal lines. A raised transverse band circles the body whorl, ending in a sharp denticle at the lip's edge. The oblong aperture opens to a white, tortuous columella that is equipped with oblique folds at its base.

== Distribution ==
This species occurs in the Red Sea and in the Indian Ocean off Madagascar.
