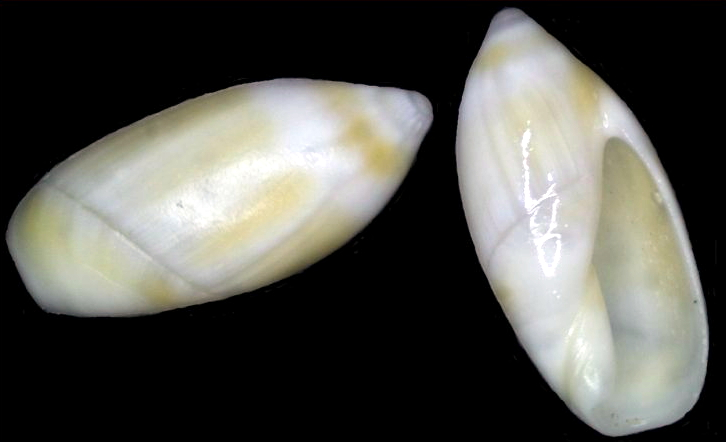
- Shell of Ancilla marmorata

Scientific classification
- Kingdom: Animalia
- Phylum: Mollusca
- Class: Gastropoda
- Subclass: Caenogastropoda
- Order: Neogastropoda
- Family: Ancillariidae
- Genus: Ancilla
- Species: A. marmorata

Binomial name
- Ancilla marmorata (Reeve, 1864)

Synonyms
- Ancilla pura Sowerby, 1892; Ancillaria marmorata Reeve, 1864 (original combination)

= Ancilla marmorata =

Species of gastropod

Ancilla marmorata is a species of sea snail, a marine gastropod mollusk in the family Ancillariidae.

== Description ==
The length of the shell attains 21 mm, its diameter 9 mm.

(Described in Latin as Ancilla nova) The shell is narrowly ovate, quite solid, and white. Its spire is exserted and somewhat pointed, with a slightly callous suture. It consists of four very slightly convex whorls, the last of which is elongated and somewhat inflated. Below the middle, this body whorl is fortified with a rather wide callous band. Above the band, it is encircled by a partly engraved groove. The columella is abbreviated, contorted, and folded, and the aperture is quite wide.

== Distribution ==
This marine species occurs off Port Alfred, South Africa.
