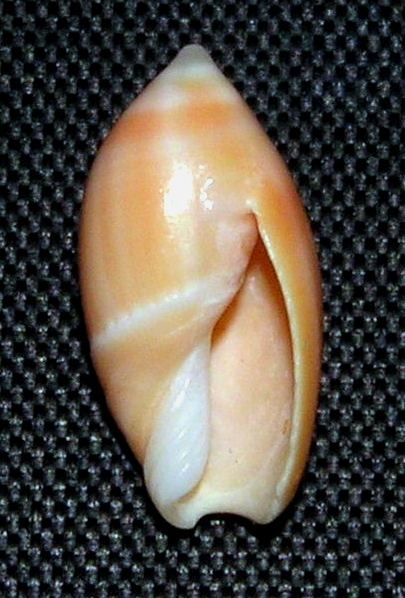
- Shell of Ancilla matthewsi

Scientific classification
- Kingdom: Animalia
- Phylum: Mollusca
- Class: Gastropoda
- Subclass: Caenogastropoda
- Order: Neogastropoda
- Family: Ancillariidae
- Genus: Ancilla
- Species: A. matthewsi

Binomial name
- Ancilla matthewsi Burch & Burch, 1967

Synonyms
- Ancilla (Hesperancilla) matthewsi J. Q. Burch & R. L. Burch, 1967 alternative representation

= Ancilla matthewsi =

Species of gastropod

Ancilla matthewsi is a species of sea snail, a marine gastropod mollusk in the family Ancillariidae.

== Description ==
The length of the shell attains 18.8 mm, its diameter 9.1 mm.

== Distribution ==
This species occurs in the Atlantic Ocean off Brazil.
