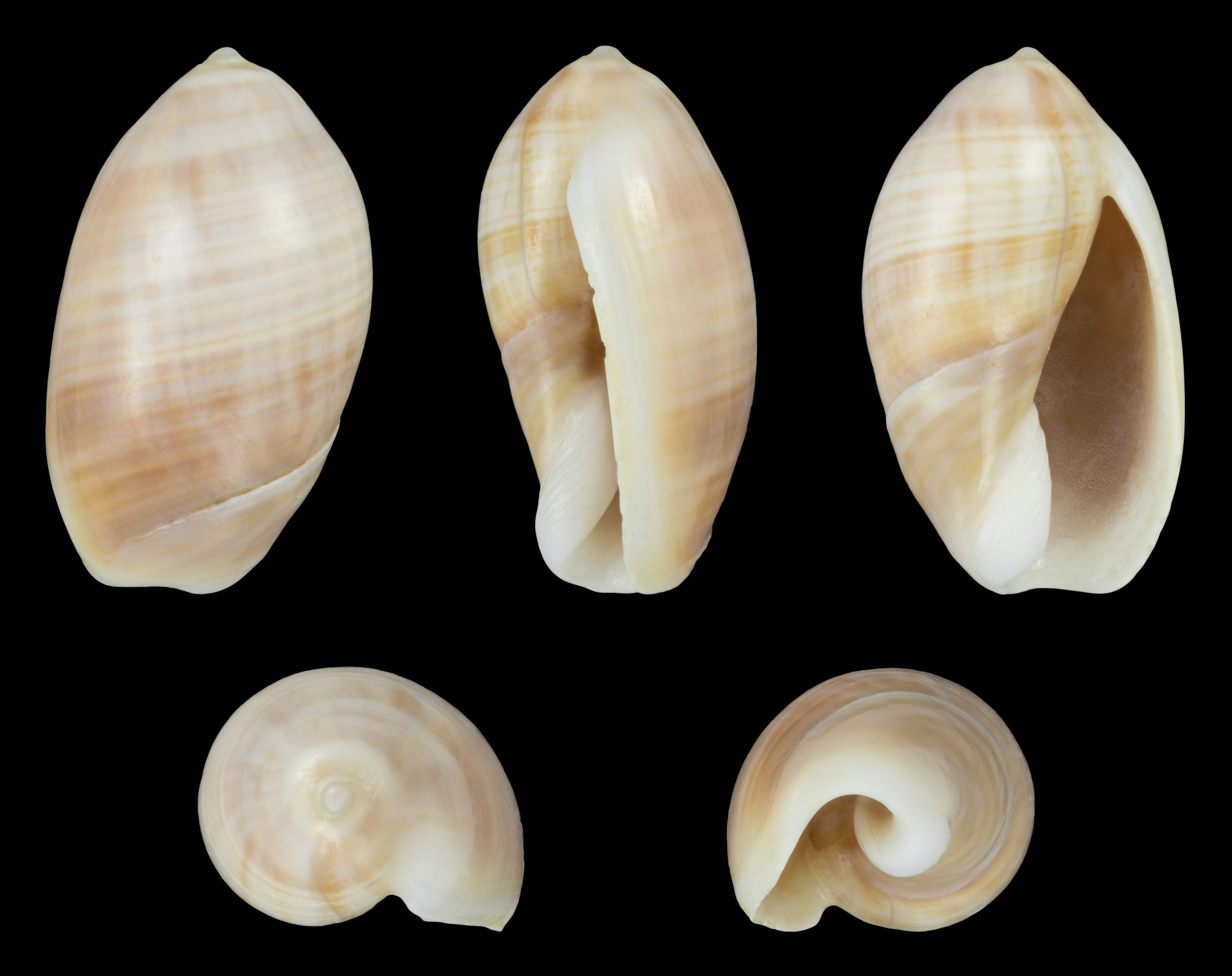
- Shell of Ancilla atimovatae

Scientific classification
- Kingdom: Animalia
- Phylum: Mollusca
- Class: Gastropoda
- Subclass: Caenogastropoda
- Order: Neogastropoda
- Family: Ancillariidae
- Genus: Ancilla
- Species: A. atimovatae

Binomial name
- Ancilla atimovatae Kantor, Fedosov, Puillandre & Bouchet, 2016

= Ancilla atimovatae =

Species of gastropod

Ancilla atimovatae is a species of sea snail, a marine gastropod mollusk in the family Ancillariidae, the olives.

== Description ==
The length of the shell attains 22 mm.

== Distribution ==
This marine species occurs off Madagascar.
