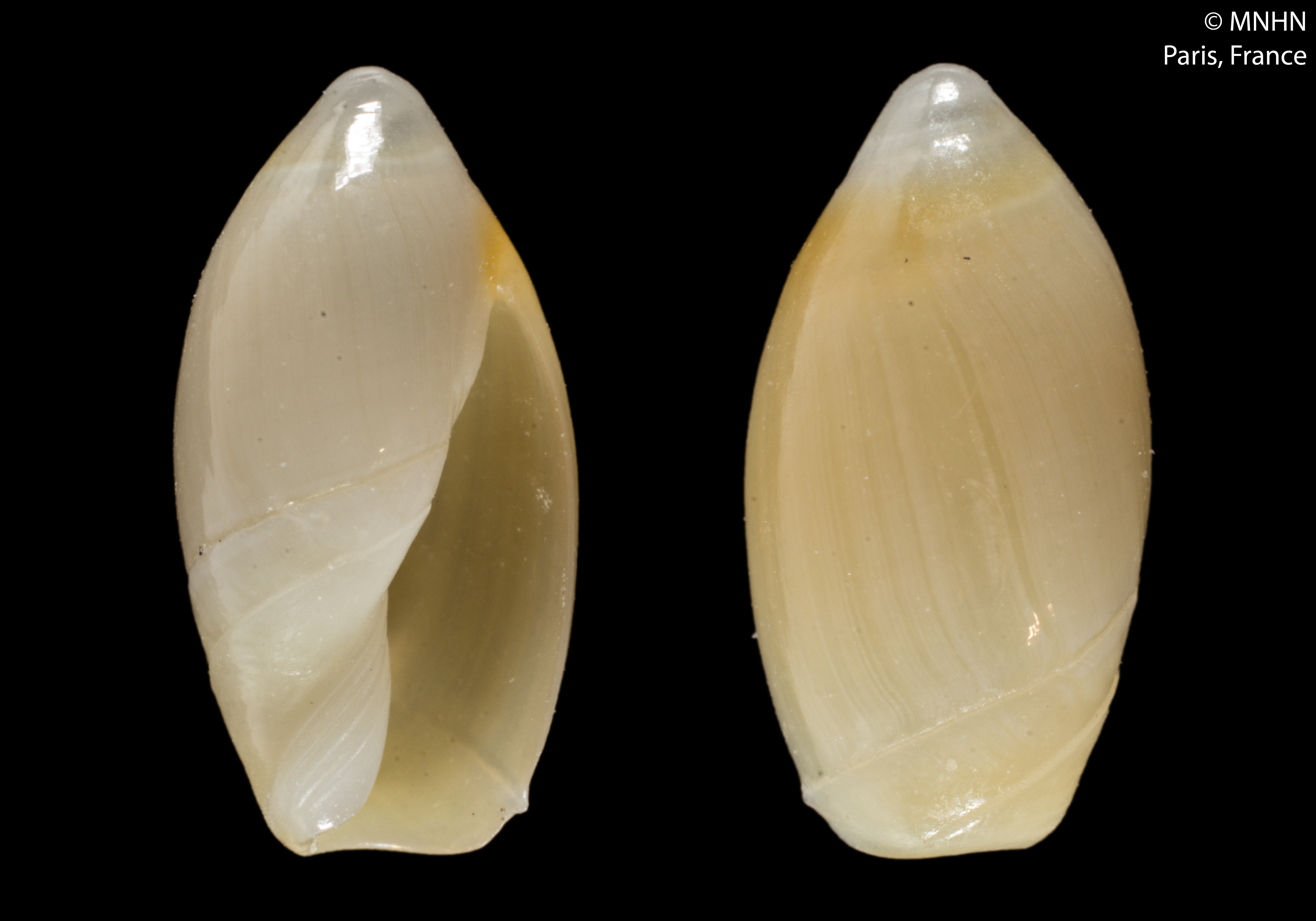
- Shell of Ancilla kaviengensis (paratype at MNHN, Paris)

Scientific classification
- Kingdom: Animalia
- Phylum: Mollusca
- Class: Gastropoda
- Subclass: Caenogastropoda
- Order: Neogastropoda
- Family: Ancillariidae
- Genus: Ancilla
- Species: A. kaviengensis

Binomial name
- Ancilla kaviengensis Kantor, Fedosov, Puillandre & Bouchet, 2016

= Ancilla kaviengensis =

Species of gastropod

Ancilla kaviengensis is a species of sea snail, a marine gastropod mollusk in the family Ancillariidae, the olives.

== Distribution ==
This marine species occurs off Papua New Guinea.
