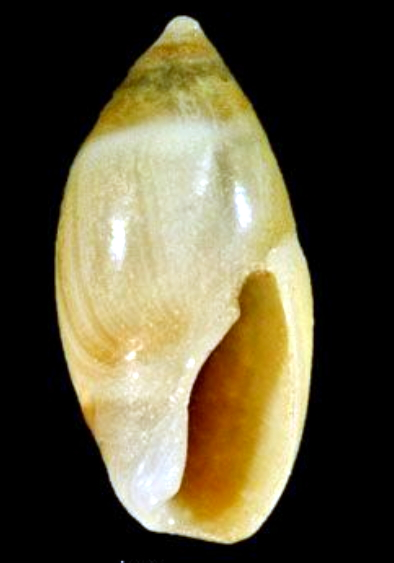
- Shell of Ancilla exigua (specimen at the Natural History Museum, Rotterdam)

Scientific classification
- Kingdom: Animalia
- Phylum: Mollusca
- Class: Gastropoda
- Subclass: Caenogastropoda
- Order: Neogastropoda
- Family: Ancillariidae
- Genus: Ancilla
- Species: A. exigua

Binomial name
- Ancilla exigua (G.B. Sowerby I, 1830)

Synonyms
- Ancilla (Chilotygma) exigua (G. B. Sowerby I, 1830); Ancillaria exigua G. B. Sowerby I, 1830; Chilotygma exigua (G. B. Sowerby I, 1830)

= Ancilla exigua =

Species of gastropod

Ancilla exigua is a species of sea snail, a marine gastropod mollusk in the family Ancillariidae.

Subspecies

- Ancilla exigua exigua (G. B. Sowerby I, 1830)
- Ancilla exigua sulcata Thiele, 1925

== Description ==
The length of the shell attains 6.5 mm.

(Original description in Latin) The shell is tiny and oblong, with an acuminated spire that equals the length of the aperture. The body whorl is furnished with a single basal band and a groove above the varix. The varix is short and obliquely striated. A solitary columellar fold is located in the upper part of the aperture, and the outer lip is toothless.

== Distribution ==
This marine species is found off the coasts of Mozambique and Tanzania, as well as off Yemen and Oman.
