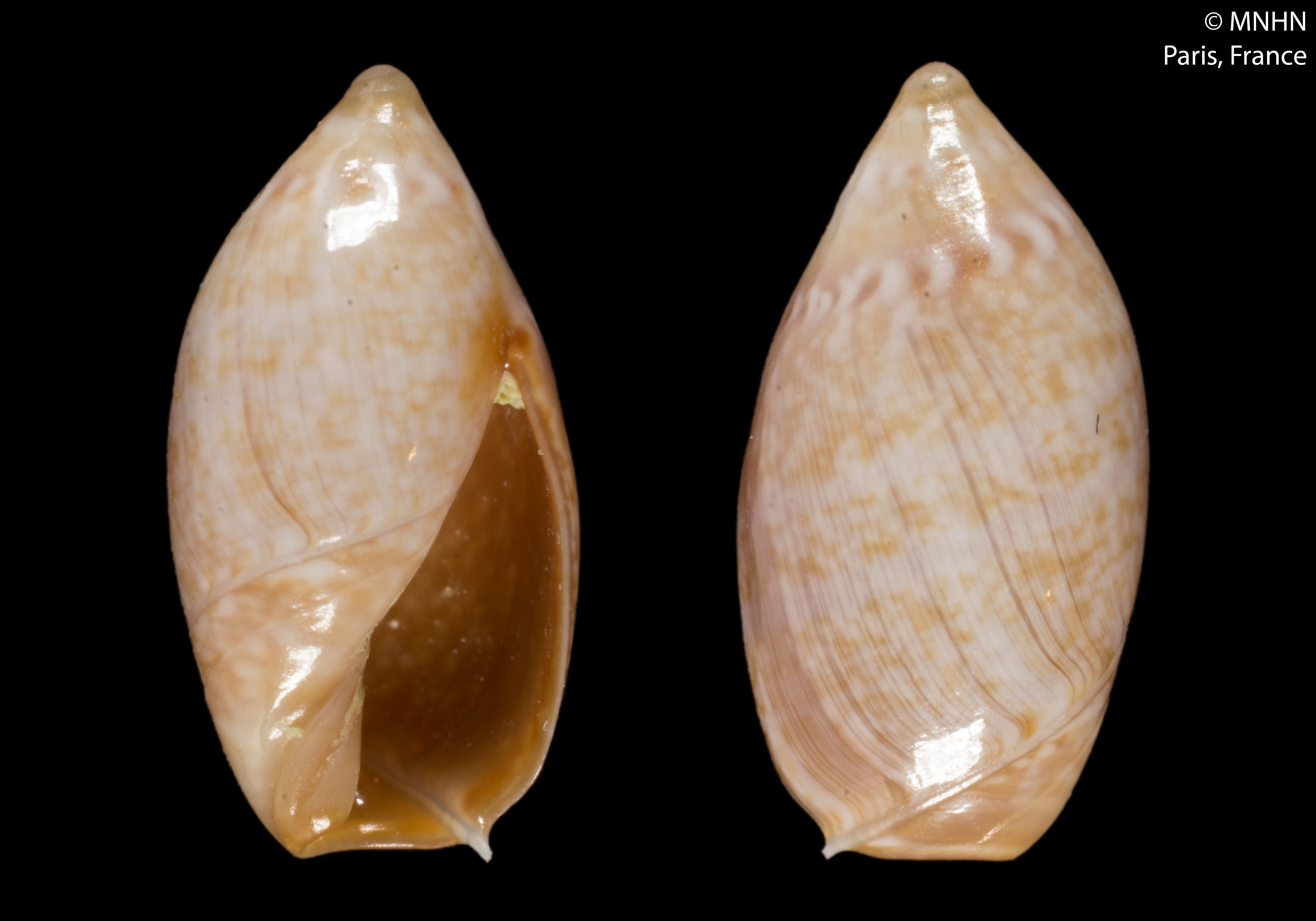
- Shell of Ancilla pruinosa (holotype at MNHN, Paris)

Scientific classification
- Kingdom: Animalia
- Phylum: Mollusca
- Class: Gastropoda
- Subclass: Caenogastropoda
- Order: Neogastropoda
- Family: Ancillariidae
- Genus: Ancilla
- Species: A. pruinosa

Binomial name
- Ancilla pruinosa F. Boyer, 2015

= Ancilla pruinosa =

Species of gastropod

Ancilla pruinosa is a species of sea snail, a marine gastropod mollusk in the family Ancillariidae.

== Distribution ==
This species occurs off Oman.
