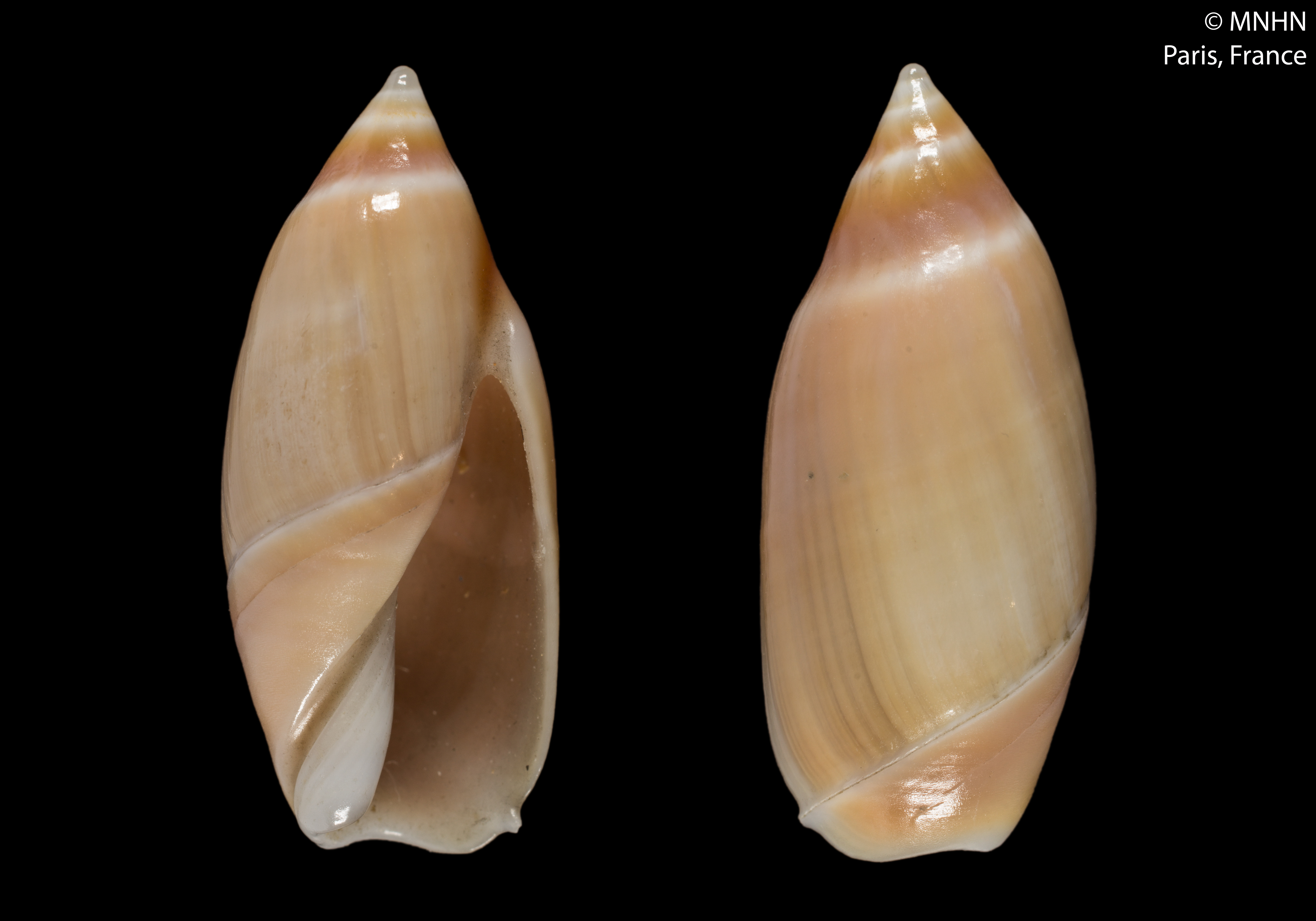
- Shell of Ancilla djiboutina (lectotype at MNHN, Paris)

Scientific classification
- Kingdom: Animalia
- Phylum: Mollusca
- Class: Gastropoda
- Subclass: Caenogastropoda
- Order: Neogastropoda
- Family: Ancillariidae
- Genus: Ancilla
- Species: A. djiboutina

Binomial name
- Ancilla djiboutina (Jousseaume, 1894)

Synonyms
- Ancilla djiboutiensis Dautzenberg, 1932 (invalid emendation of Ancillaria djiboutina); Ancillaria djiboutina Jousseaume, 1894 (original combination)

= Ancilla djiboutina =

Species of gastropod

Ancilla djiboutina is a species of sea snail, a marine gastropod mollusk in the family Ancillariidae, the olives.

== Description ==
This species' shell grows to approximately 26 mm long, with a diameter of mm.

(Original description in Latin) An oblong-ovate shell, pale tawny above, whitish below, with a callous, conically pointed spire encircled by white lines at the suture. The lower suture is white-margined and toothed; the anterior band is fleshy-tawny, divided in the middle. The aperture is elongated, triangular, and flared at the base. The columella is tortuous, white, and very finely striated.

== Distribution ==
This marine species is found off Djibouti, East Africa.
