= Ancilla eloiseae =

Scientific classification
- Kingdom: Animalia
- Phylum: Mollusca
- Class: Gastropoda
- Subclass: Caenogastropoda
- Order: Neogastropoda
- Family: Ancillariidae
- Genus: Ancilla
- Species: A. eloiseae

Binomial name
- Ancilla eloiseae T. Cossignani, 2023

Species of gastropod

Ancilla eloiseae is a species of sea snail, a marine gastropod mollusk in the family Ancillariidae, the olives.

== Distribution ==
This species occurs off the Philippines.
