= Amalda coccinata =

Scientific classification
- Kingdom: Animalia
- Phylum: Mollusca
- Class: Gastropoda
- Subclass: Caenogastropoda
- Order: Neogastropoda
- Family: Ancillariidae
- Genus: Amalda
- Species: A. coccinata

Binomial name
- Amalda coccinata Kilburn, 1980

Synonyms
- Amalda (Alocospira) coccinata Kilburn, 1980; Amalda (Exiquaspira) gabelishi Ninomiya, 1988; Ancilla coccinea Hedley, 1914 (non-Fischer, 1807)

Species of gastropod

Amalda coccinata is a species of sea snail, a marine gastropod mollusk in the family Ancillariidae.

== Description ==
The length of the shell attains 45 mm.

== Distribution ==
This marine species occurs off South Australia and Western Australia.
