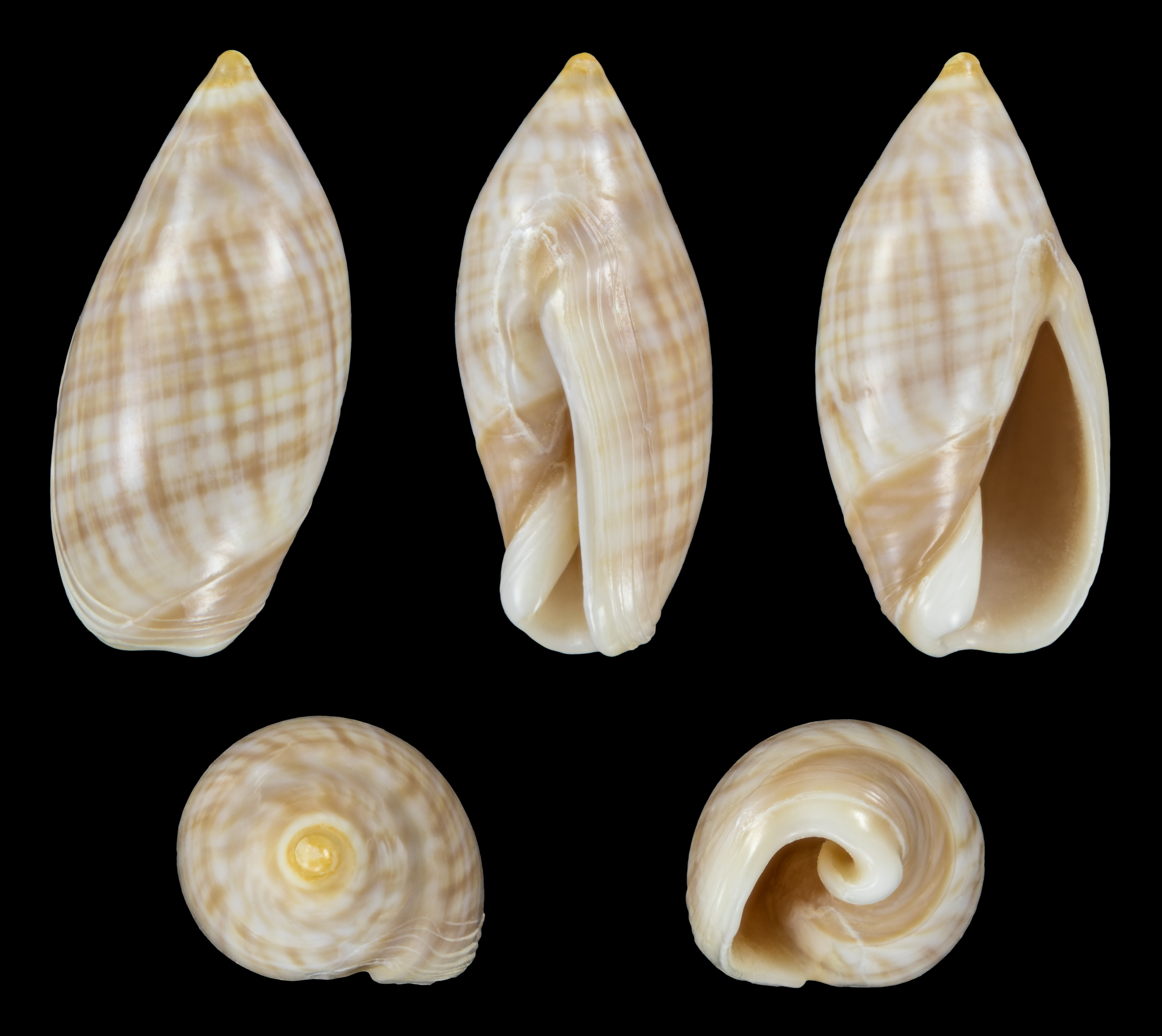

Scientific classification
- Kingdom: Animalia
- Phylum: Mollusca
- Class: Gastropoda
- Subclass: Caenogastropoda
- Order: Neogastropoda
- Family: Ancillariidae
- Genus: Ancilla
- Species: A. ventricosa

Binomial name
- Ancilla ventricosa (Lamarck, 1811)

Synonyms
- Ancilla (Sparella) ventricosa ventricosa (Lamarck, 1811); Ancillaria ventricosa Lamarck, 1811 (original combination)

= Ancilla ventricosa =

Species of gastropod

Ancilla ventricosa is a species of sea snail, a marine gastropod mollusk in the family Ancillariidae, the olives and the like.

== Subspecies ==
- Ancilla ventricosa fulva (Swainson, 1825)
- Ancilla ventricosa ventricosa (Lamarck, 1811)

== Description ==
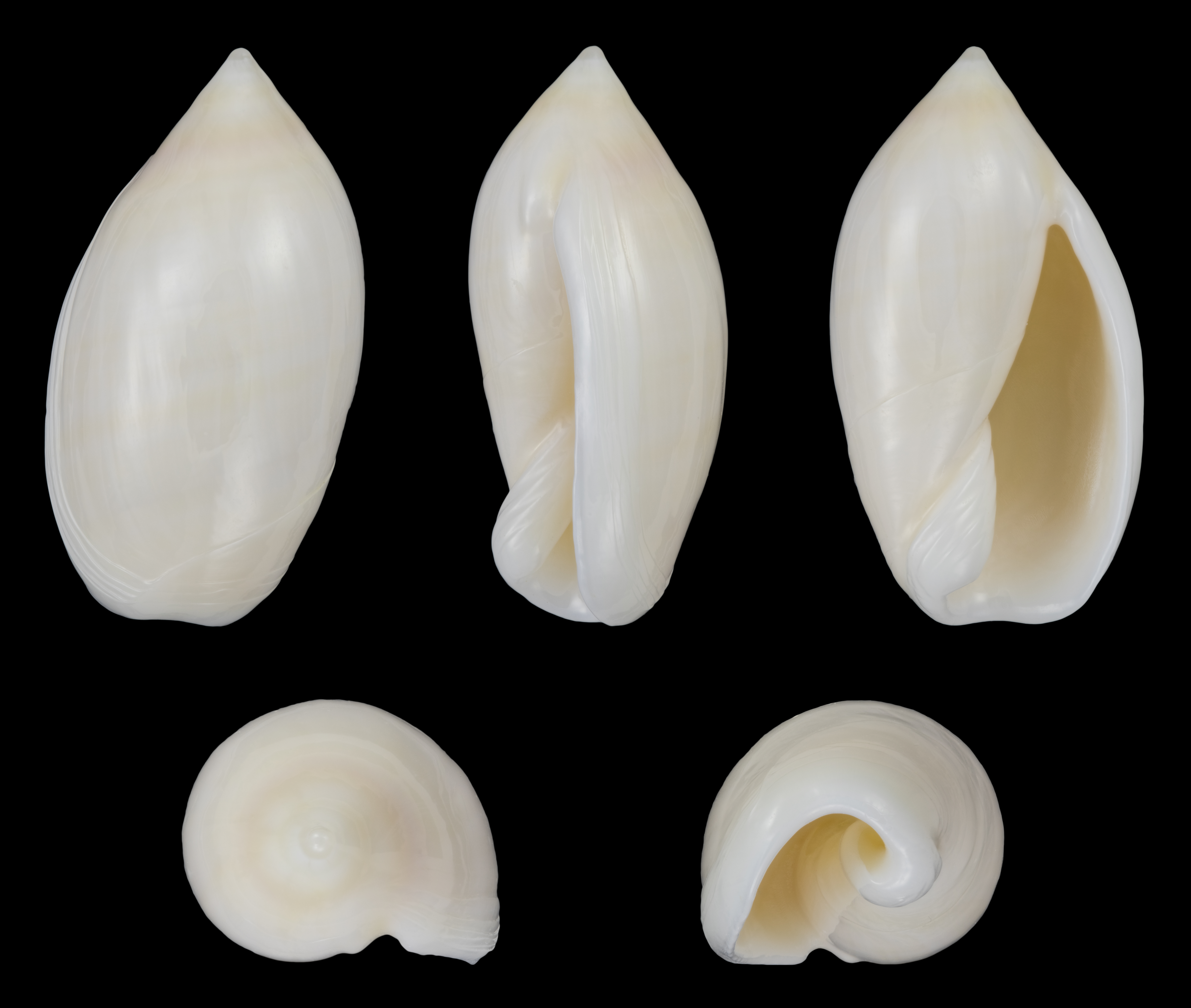
Ancilla ventricosa fulva

The length of the shell varies between 15 mm and 38 mm.

(Original description in French) This species is more ventricose and consequently less cylindrical. It is entirely of a tawny orange color, and the sutures of its spire whorls are fused and indistinct. Its columellar fold is thick, white, and almost smooth.

== Distribution ==
This species occurs in the Red Sea and in the Indian Ocean off Mozambique.

== Habitat ==
Sandy areas at 10-15 metres depth.
