= Ancilla culierei =

Scientific classification
- Kingdom: Animalia
- Phylum: Mollusca
- Class: Gastropoda
- Subclass: Caenogastropoda
- Order: Neogastropoda
- Family: Ancillariidae
- Genus: Ancilla
- Species: A. culierei

Binomial name
- Ancilla culierei T. Cossignani & Quiquandon, 2019

Species of gastropod

Ancilla culierei is a species of sea snail, a marine gastropod mollusk in the family Ancillariidae.

== Distribution ==
This marine species occurs off India.
