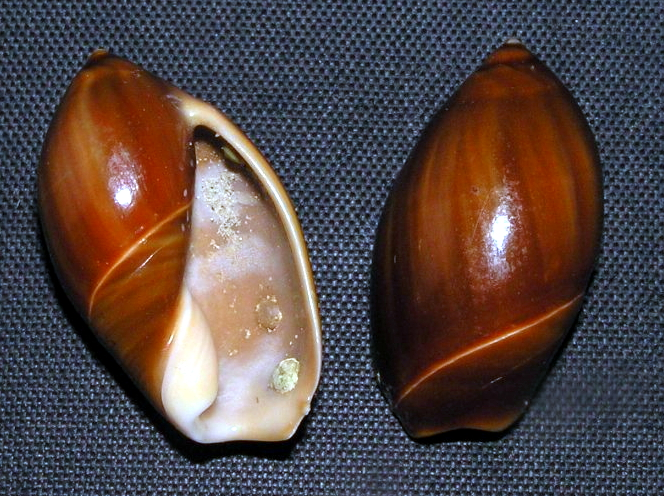
- Shell of Ancilla castanea

Scientific classification
- Kingdom: Animalia
- Phylum: Mollusca
- Class: Gastropoda
- Subclass: Caenogastropoda
- Order: Neogastropoda
- Family: Ancillariidae
- Genus: Ancilla
- Species: A. castanea

Binomial name
- Ancilla castanea (G.B. Sowerby I, 1830)

Synonyms
- Ancilla (Sparella) castanea (G. B. Sowerby I, 1830) alternative representation; Ancilla castanea f. aurantiaca Scali, 2023 unavailable name (infrasubspecific name); Ancillaria castanea G. B. Sowerby I, 1830 (original combination); Ancillaria deshayesii G. B. Sowerby II, 1859 junior subjective synonym

= Ancilla castanea =

Species of gastropod

Ancilla castanea is a species of sea snail, a marine gastropod mollusk in the family Ancillariidae.

Subspecies

- Ancilla castanea albolutea Scali, 2023
- Ancilla castanea castanea (G. B. Sowerby I, 1830)
- Ancilla castanea lutoflava Scali, 2023

== Description ==
The shell ranges in size from 25 to 32 mm.

(Original description in Latin) The shell is oblong-ovate, ventricose, and chestnut-colored. The spire is subacuminate with a white apex. The body whorl is equipped with two basal bands and a groove above the varix. The columellar varix is whitish, with a sinistral groove and some oblique striae. The aperture is subacuminate superiorly, with a strong tooth on the outer lip near the base.

== Distribution ==
This species is found in the Indian Ocean, specifically in sandy areas of shallow water off the coast of Oman. Its range also extends from the southern Red Sea to the Persian Gulf and to India.
