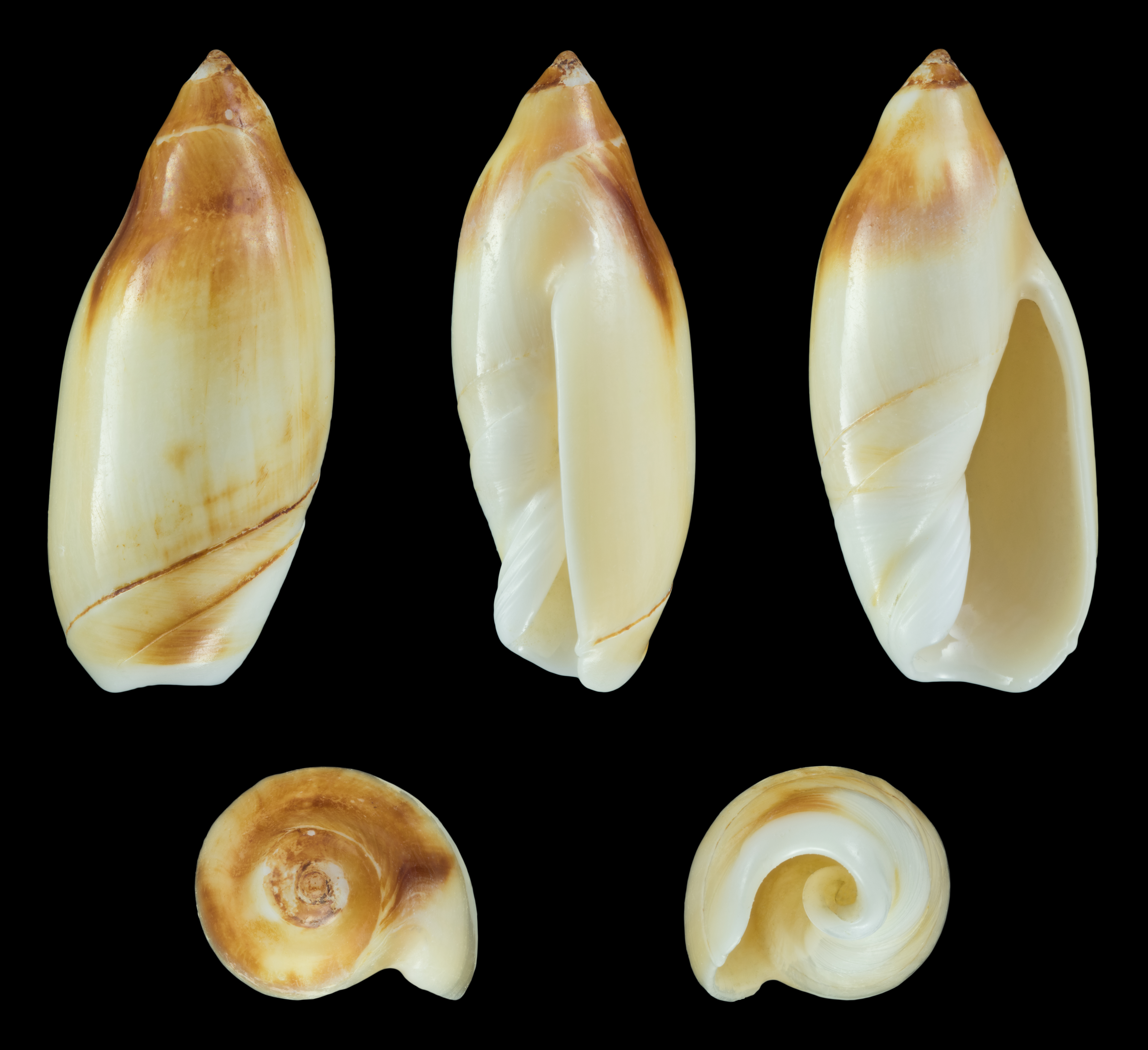
- Shell of Ancilla ampla

Scientific classification
- Kingdom: Animalia
- Phylum: Mollusca
- Class: Gastropoda
- Subclass: Caenogastropoda
- Order: Neogastropoda
- Family: Ancillariidae
- Genus: Ancilla
- Species: A. ampla

Binomial name
- Ancilla ampla (Gmelin, 1791)

Synonyms
- Amalda ampla (Gmelin, 1791); Ancilla (Sparellina) ampla (Gmelin, 1791) · alternative representation; Ancillaria candida Lamarck, 1811; Voluta ampla Gmelin, 1791

= Ancilla ampla =

Species of gastropod

Ancilla ampla is a species of sea snail, a marine gastropod mollusk in the family Ancillariidae.

There exist two subspecies:

- Ancilla ampla ampla (Gmelin, 1791)
- Ancilla ampla cylindrica (G.B. Sowerby II, 1859)

== Description ==
(Original description in Latin) An elongated shell featuring a broad aperture and a sharp outer lip. The whorls of the spire are concealed.

(Described as Ancillaria candida) This species is elongated, somewhat narrow, semi-cylindrical, pointed at the apex, and has a short spire whose whorls have an almost effaced suture. It is entirely white, but on some individuals, a few orange spots can be seen near their apex. The aperture is slightly flared in its lower part.

== Distribution ==
This marine species occurs off India, the Maldives, Sri Lanka and Indonesia; also in the Red Sea and the Gulf of Oman.
