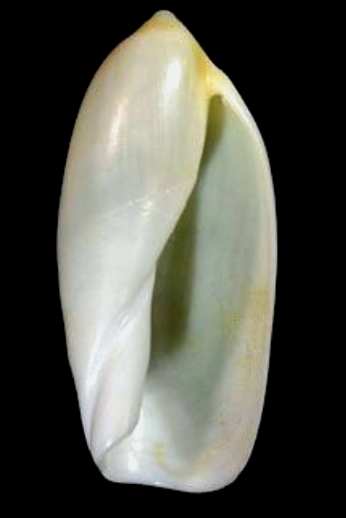
- Shell of Ancilla scaphella (specimen at the Natural History Museum Rotterdam)

Scientific classification
- Kingdom: Animalia
- Phylum: Mollusca
- Class: Gastropoda
- Subclass: Caenogastropoda
- Order: Neogastropoda
- Family: Ancillariidae
- Genus: Ancilla
- Species: A. scaphella

Binomial name
- Ancilla scaphella (G.B. Sowerby II, 1859)

Synonyms
- Ancilla (Sparella) scaphella (G. B. Sowerby II, 1859) alternative representation; Ancillaria scaphella G. B. Sowerby II, 1859 (original combination)

= Ancilla scaphella =

Species of gastropod

Ancilla scaphella is a species of sea snail, a marine gastropod mollusk in the family Ancillariidae.

== Description ==
The length of the shell attains 26 mm.

(Original description in Latin) The shell is cylindrical and white. The spire is short. The aperture is large and barely emarginate at the base. The varix is smooth and elongated, with the inferior band scarcely distinct. The inferior suture is elevated.

This shell is cylindrical, white, and smooth. The basal suture is distinct, imparting an angularity to the growth lines and culminating in a scarcely perceptible projection.

== Distribution ==
This marine species occurs off Oman.
