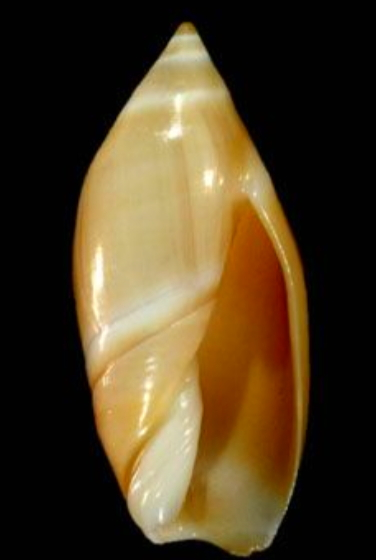
- Shell of Ancilla albisulcata (specimen at the Natural History Museum, Rotterdamà

Scientific classification
- Kingdom: Animalia
- Phylum: Mollusca
- Class: Gastropoda
- Subclass: Caenogastropoda
- Order: Neogastropoda
- Family: Ancillariidae
- Genus: Ancilla
- Species: A. albisulcata

Binomial name
- Ancilla albisulcata (G.B. Sowerby I, 1830)

Synonyms
- Ancilla (Sparellina) albisulcata (G. B. Sowerby I, 1830) alternative representation; Ancillaria achatina Kiener, 1844 junior subjective synonym; Ancillaria albisulcata G. B. Sowerby I, 1830 · unaccepted (original combination)

= Ancilla albisulcata =

Species of gastropod

Ancilla albisulcata is a species of sea snail, a marine gastropod mollusk in the family Ancillariidae.

== Description ==
The shell reaches a length of 27 mm.

(Original description in Latin) The shell is ovate-oblong, subventricose, and chestnut-colored. The spire is very short, usually mucronate, sometimes very blunt, and obscurely whitish-banded at the base. The body whorl is furnished with two bands at its base, the upper margin of which is white. The groove above the varix is inconspicuous. The varix is white, oblique, and striated. The aperture is acuminated superiorly and effuse below. The upper margin of the outer lip is usually rather thick, while the lower margin is acute and unidentate.

== Distribution ==
This species occurs in the Red Sea off Israel, Saudi Arabia, Eritrea, Yemen; also off Oman.
