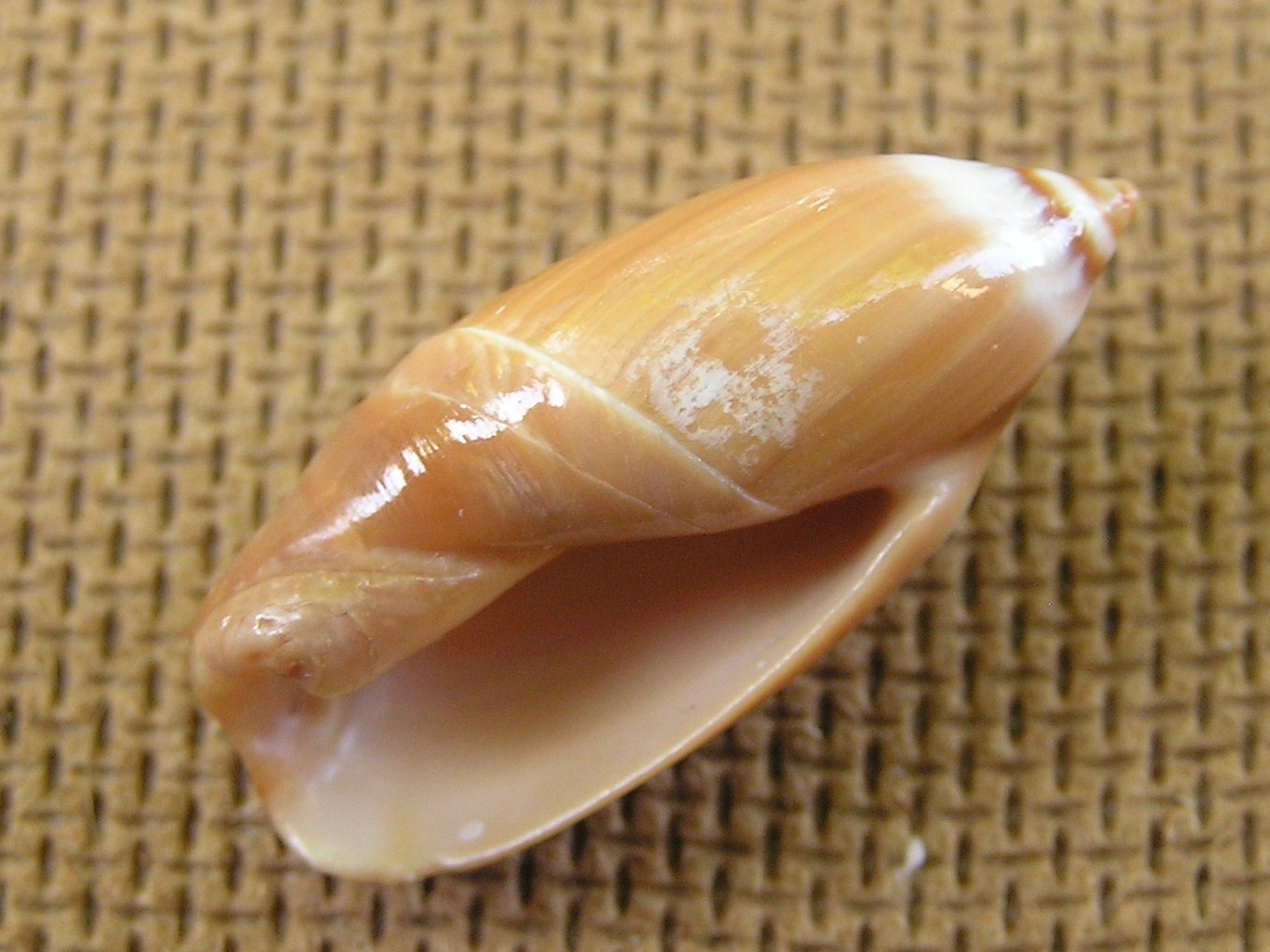
- Apertural view of a shell of Ancilla cinnamomea

Scientific classification
- Kingdom: Animalia
- Phylum: Mollusca
- Class: Gastropoda
- Subclass: Caenogastropoda
- Order: Neogastropoda
- Family: Ancillariidae
- Genus: Ancilla
- Species: A. cinnamomea

Binomial name
- Ancilla cinnamomea Lamarck, 1801

Synonyms
- Ancilla coccinea Fischer, 1807; Ancillaria castanea Sowerby, 1830; Ancillaria cinnamomea Tryon, 1853; Bulla cypraea Linnaeus, 1758; Oliva (Viduoliva) vidua cinnamomea (f) Menke, K.T., 1830

= Ancilla cinnamomea =

Species of gastropod

Ancilla cinnamomea is a species of sea snail, a marine gastropod mollusk in the family Ancillariidae.

== Description ==
The shell grows to a length of 33 to 50 mm. Its spire is short and the whirls are indistinct. The pillar at its base has a thick, somewhat striated oblique enlargement.

== Distribution ==
This marine species occurs off Tanzania, in the Red Sea; off India, Sri Lanka and the Philippines.
