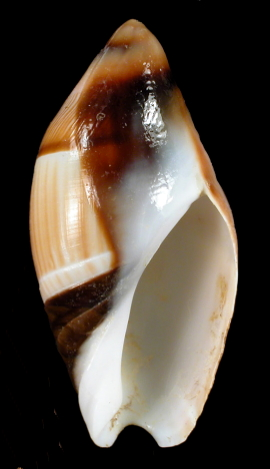
- Shell of Amalda optima

Scientific classification
- Kingdom: Animalia
- Phylum: Mollusca
- Class: Gastropoda
- Subclass: Caenogastropoda
- Order: Neogastropoda
- Family: Ancillariidae
- Genus: Amalda
- Species: A. optima

Binomial name
- Amalda optima (G.B. Sowerby III, 1897)

Synonyms
- Ancilla optima G.B. Sowerby III, 1897

= Amalda optima =

Species of gastropod

Amalda optima is a species of sea snail, a marine gastropod mollusk in the family Ancillariidae.

== Description ==
The length of the shell attains 55 mm.

The shell is broadly ovate with a narrow base and a low, conical spire. The primary spire callus is very thick, smooth, and glossy, covering all whorls except the tip of the protoconch, making measurements impossible. The secondary callus is also rather thick, with a distinct anterior border, smooth and glossy, merging seamlessly with the parietal callus and extending to the shell apex. The plication plate is smooth and poorly separated from the anterior band, and the columella is smooth as well. The olivoid groove is distinct, with a short, obtuse denticle on the outer lip. The anterior band is smooth, with the upper portion nearly flat and the lower portion slightly convex.

The primary callus has a milky-caramel color with distinct, sinuous, narrow brown axial lines that are especially pronounced on the body whorl. A narrow spiral brown line, bordered by a lighter line below, further accents the primary callus. The secondary callus ranges from caramel to dark brown, lightening to nearly white near the aperture. The body whorl is a light caramel with irregularly spaced, orthocline brown axial bands of varying width. The olivoid band is a creamy color, lighter than the rest of the shell, while the anterior band is a deep, dark brown.

== Distribution ==
This deepwater marine species occurs from Natal, South Africa to Mozambique: dredged at 100 m. depth.
