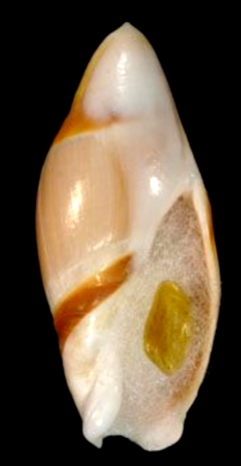
- Shell of Amalda albocallosa (specimen at the Natural History Museum, Rotterdam)

Scientific classification
- Kingdom: Animalia
- Phylum: Mollusca
- Class: Gastropoda
- Subclass: Caenogastropoda
- Order: Neogastropoda
- Family: Ancillariidae
- Genus: Amalda
- Species: A. albocallosa

Binomial name
- Amalda albocallosa (Lischke, 1873)
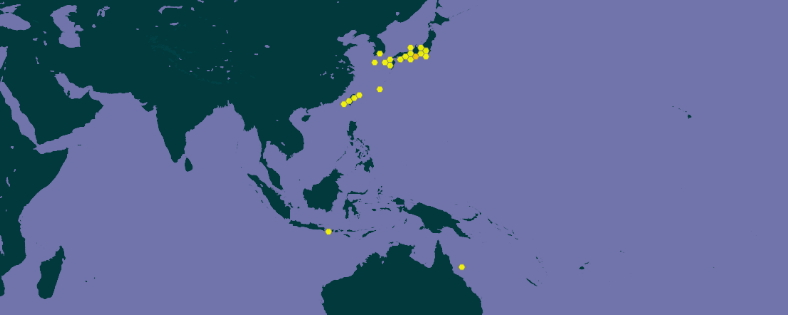

Synonyms
- Amalda albicallosa [sic] (misspelling); Ancilla albocallosa (Lischke, 1873); † Ancilla okawai Yokoyama, 1923 junior subjective synonym; Ancillaria albocallosa Lischke, 1873 (original combination)

= Amalda albocallosa =

Species of gastropod

Amalda albocallosa is a species of sea snail, a marine gastropod mollusk in the family Ancillariidae.

== Description ==
The length of the shell attains 51 mm, its diameter 18 mm.

(Description of † Ancilla okawai) The shell is subfusiform, tending toward a cylindrical shape. The spire is very short, blunt at the apex, and completely covered by callus, which features several fine spiral grooves. This callus also extends over the upper portion of the body whorl and descends to cover the upper part of the inner lip. The body whorl is inflated and finely striated with spiral lines, and where it meets the spire, there is a shallow excavation. Near the base, two spiral bands are present, one above the other. The upper band is narrower and bordered by grooves on both sides, while the lower band is one and a half to twice as broad, with a ridge running through its center. Below the lower band, the base is smooth and separated from the lower part of the inner lip by a deep, broad valley. At this location, the inner lip exhibits three longitudinal grooves that decrease in size inward. The wide aperture is long, occupying more than seventy percent of the shell's height. The outer lip is thin, and the siphonal canal is broad and short. The aperture, the columella and the inner side of the callus are pink. There is no umbilicus.

== Distribution ==
This marine species is found in Japan, Korea, Taiwan and Indonesia.
