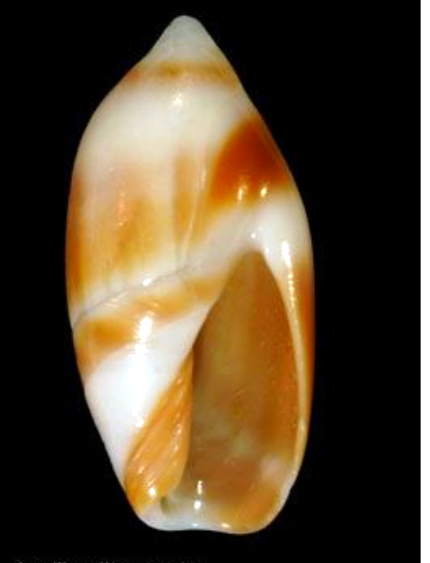
- Shell of Ancilla albozonata (specimen at the Natural History Museum, Rotterdam)

Scientific classification
- Kingdom: Animalia
- Phylum: Mollusca
- Class: Gastropoda
- Subclass: Caenogastropoda
- Order: Neogastropoda
- Family: Ancillariidae
- Genus: Ancilla
- Species: A. albozonata

Binomial name
- Ancilla albozonata E.A. Smith, 1904

Synonyms
- Ancilla (Sparella) albozonata E. A. Smith, 1904 alternative representation; Ancilla ordinaria var. major W. H. Turton, 1932 (junior synonym); Sparella albozonata (E. A. Smith, 1904)

= Ancilla albozonata =

Species of gastropod

Ancilla albozonata is a species of sea snail, a marine gastropod mollusk in the family Ancillariidae.

== Description ==
The length of the shell attains 20 mm, its diameter 10 mm.

(Original description in Latin) The shell is oblong and acuminated above. It is brown, white at the apex, and zoned with white below the suture, below the middle of the body whorl, and around the base. The spire is convexly acuminated and covered with a thin callus. The aperture is elongated, equaling about 1/4 of the total length, brown inside, and white anteriorly below the columella. The outer lip is thin, slightly arcuate, white above at its insertion, and stained with white anteriorly at the extremity of the external zone. The columella is almost reflexed anteriorly, obliquely sulcate, and brownish.

The coloration of this species is both characteristic and constant. The apex of the spire is white, and a white band encircles the upper part, or shoulder, of the body-whorl. A narrower white zone accompanies the upper of the two oblique grooves that cross the lower part of the whorl, and the base is also white. The surface is smooth, exhibiting only faint growth lines.

== Distribution ==
This marine species occurs off Port Alfred, South Africa.
