= Richard Kilburn =

South African malacologist

Richard Neil "Dick" Kilburn (Port Elizabeth, 7 January 1942– 26 July 2013) was a South African malacologist.

He attended the University of Natal, Pietermaritzburg, majoring in zoology and botany and graduated in 1967. After a brief spell as a teacher, he started his career at a malacological position at the East London Museum. Already 18 months later he became the malacologist at the Natal Museum, where he would spend the rest of his career. Under his stewardship the Mollusca collection of this museum was to become by far the largest such collection in Africa. He increased the catalogued lot from 9000 specimens to nearly 150,000. He expanded considerably the book collection of the museum on key literature to establish a molluscan research centre, essential for research in these pre-computer days. He started an active programme of field research on Mollusca. In later life he specialized in the description and research of species in the family Turridae, continuing during his retirement.

He is the author or co-author of 363 new species and subspecies names and of 27 new genera and subgenera. Most of these concerned taxa from South Africa or Mozambique. Many of these new species were obtained, in collaboration with D.G. Herbert, during the Natal Museum Dredging Programme (1981–1993). His publications on South African marine Mollusca are numerous in peer-reviewed journal articles (102 publications), 2 books and 11 book chapters authored or co-authored by him. The publication of Seashells of Southern Africa, published in 1982, was a landmark in his career.

The World Register of Marine Species lists 416 taxa of marine species named by Kilburn.

Fifty-one marine species were named after him in recognition of his work, including species of hermit-crab, holothurians and fish.
