= Sowerby (surname) =

Sowerby is a surname. Notable people with the surname include:

== Sowerby family, naturalists and artists ==
- Sowerby family, a British family of naturalists and artists
  - Arthur de Carle Sowerby (1885–1954), British explorer in China
  - Charlotte Caroline Sowerby (1820–1865), British natural history illustrator
  - George Brettingham Sowerby I (1788–1854), British malacologist
  - George Brettingham Sowerby II (1812–1884), British malacologist
  - George Brettingham Sowerby III (1843–1921), British malacologist
  - James Sowerby (1757–1822), British zoologist and painter
  - James Sowerby (1815–1834), British mycologist
  - James de Carle Sowerby (1787–1871), English scientist and artist
  - John Edward Sowerby (1825–1870), artist and publisher

== Others ==
=== Artists ===
- John George Sowerby (1850–1914), English painter and illustrator
- Millicent Sowerby (1878–1967), English painter and illustrator

=== Politicians ===
- John Sowerby (MP) (fl. 1391–1411), English lawyer and Member of Parliament
- William Sowerby (politician) (born 1956), American politician

=== Other occupations ===
- E. Millicent Sowerby (1883–1977), English bibliographer
- Francis Sowerby Macaulay, British mathematician
- Fred Sowerby (born 1948), Antigua and Barbuda sprinter
- Githa Sowerby (1876–1970), English playwright
- Leo Sowerby (1895–1968), twentieth-century American composer
- William Sowerby (clergyman) (1799–1875), English clergyman

== Fictional characters ==
- From The Secret Garden by Frances Hodgson Burnett
  - Dickon Sowerby, a main character with knowledge about nature
  - Martha Sowerby, a servant at the house and Mary's maid
  - Mrs Sowerby, Dickon and Martha's mother.
