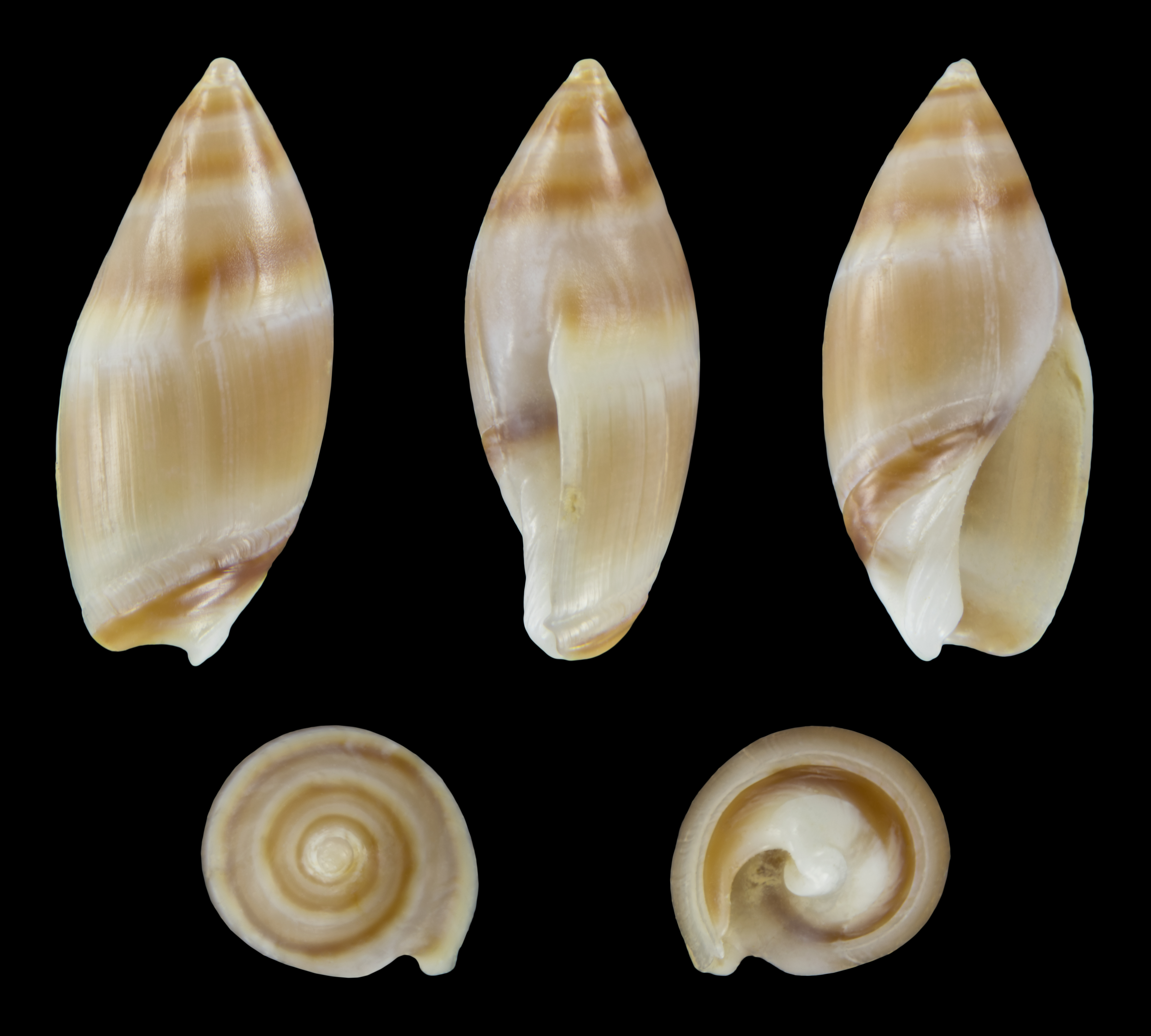

Scientific classification
- Kingdom: Animalia
- Phylum: Mollusca
- Class: Gastropoda
- Subclass: Caenogastropoda
- Order: Neogastropoda
- Family: Ancillariidae
- Genus: Amalda
- Species: A. novaezelandiae

Binomial name
- Amalda novaezelandiae (Sowerby II, 1859)

Synonyms
- † Amalda (Gracilispira) firthi Olson, 1956 junior subjective synonym; Amalda (Gracilispira) novaezelandiae G. B. Sowerby II, 1859 superseded combination; Ancilla (Anaulax) nana R. B. Watson, 1886 junior subjective synonym; Ancilla crystallina Brookes, 1926 junior subjective synonym; Ancilla nana R.B. Watson, 1886 junior subjective synonym; Ancillaria bicolor [sic] (misspelling and misapplication of tricolor Gray, 1847 by Suter, 1913); Ancillaria novaezelandiae Sowerby, 1859; † Baryspira (Gracilispira) firthi Olson, 1956 junior subjective synonym); Baryspira novaezelandiae Olson, 1956; Baryspira novaezelandiae benthicola Dell, 1956

= Amalda novaezelandiae =

Species of gastropod

Amalda novaezelandiae is a species of small sea snail, a gastropod mollusc of the family Ancillariidae.

== Description ==
(Original description in Latin) The shell is small and white, resembling Amalda marginata but is more slender, with a smooth, pyramidal spire and a short aperture. Like Amalda lineata and Amalda oblonga, it differs from Amalda marginata in having no ridges on the spire; from Amalda lineata, which it otherwise most nearly resembles, in the shortness of the aperture.

(Described as Ancilla (Anaulax) nana) Shell: Narrowly ovate and brown, adorned with whitish and darker bands. The spire is high and small, sharply pointed, with a concealed suture, a narrow aperture, and a prominent labial pad.

Sculpture: Longitudinals — faint growth lines are present. Spirals — the columella and the front of the shell are twisted, scored, and white, with a sharply defined upper edge. Above this, a brown band is bordered by a fine furrow, with another similar, sharper furrow slightly above, which extends into a small prickle on the outer lip. The upper portion of the body whorl is encased in enamel, banded with alternating white, brown, and pale tones. These bands continue up the spire, making it possible to count the whorls.

Color: Fawn, with white and brown bands. The spire is high and delicate, while the apex is small, bluntly rounded, and free from enamel.

Whorls: Six, with the last being slightly elongated and faintly swollen. The suture is concealed.

Aperture: Narrowly oval, pointed at the top, truncated, and notched at the front. The outer lip is gently curved, thin, and ends in a projecting point at the front edge. The inner lip is slightly convex along the body, concave below, with a thick labial pad that reinforces the twisted columella, fills the upper aperture, extends over the body, and covers the spire.

Operculum: Triangular-lanceolate, sharply pointed at the top with a terminal nucleus toward the outer edge. It is faintly lined, thin, yellow, and slightly glossy, and completely fills the shell’s aperture.

== Distribution ==
This marine species is endemic to New Zealand and occurs off North Island and northern part of South Island, and Chatham Rise. It also appears in the fossil record
