= Heilprinia =

Scientific classification
- Kingdom: Animalia
- Phylum: Mollusca
- Class: Gastropoda
- Subclass: Caenogastropoda
- Order: Neogastropoda
- Superfamily: Buccinoidea
- Family: Fasciolariidae
- Genus: Heilprinia; Grabau, 1904

Type species
- † Fusus caloosaensis Heilprin, 1886

Synonyms
- Fusinus (Heilprinia) Grabau, 1904

Genus of gastropods

Heilprinia is a genus of sea snails, marine gastropod mollusks in the subfamily Fusininae of the family Fasciolariidae, the spindle snails, the tulip snails and their allies.

== Species ==
Species within the genus Heilprinia include:

- Heilprinia burnsii (Dall, 1890) †
- Heilprinia caloosaensis (Heilprin, 1886) †
- Heilprinia carolinensis (Dall, 1892) †
- Heilprinia coltrorum (Hadorn & Rogers, 2000)
- Heilprinia dianeae (Petuch, 1994) †
- Heilprinia diegelae Petuch, 1994 †
- Heilprinia dowiana (Olsson, 1954)
- Heilprinia exilis (Conrad, 1832) †
- Heilprinia hasta Petuch, 1994 †
- Heilprinia miamiensis Petuch, 1994 †
- Heilprinia portelli Petuch, 1994 †
- Heilprinia timessa (Dall, 1889)

Species brought into synonymy

- Heilprinia couei (Petit de la Saussaye, 1853): synonym of Aristofusus couei (Petit de la Saussaye, 1853)
- Heilprinia helenae (Bartsch, 1939) : synonym of Aristofusus helenae (Bartsch, 1939)
- Heilprinia lindae Petuch, 1987 : synonym of Heilprinia timessa (Dall, 1889)
- Heilprinia robusta (Trask, 1855) : synonym of Harfordia robusta (Trask, 1855)
