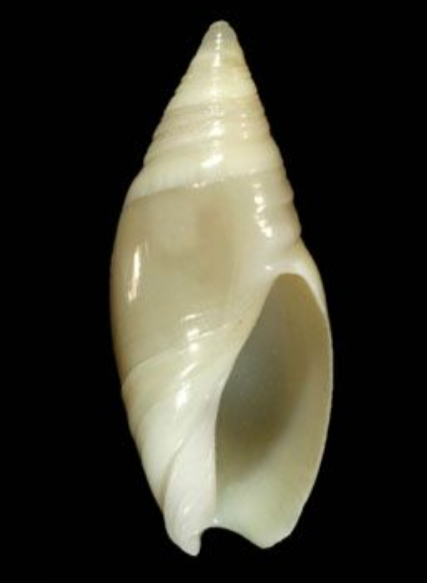
- Shell of Amalda sinensis (specimen at the Natural History Museum, Rotterdam)

Scientific classification
- Kingdom: Animalia
- Phylum: Mollusca
- Class: Gastropoda
- Subclass: Caenogastropoda
- Order: Neogastropoda
- Family: Ancillariidae
- Genus: Amalda
- Species: A. sinensis

Binomial name
- Amalda sinensis (G.B. Sowerby II, 1859)

Synonyms
- Ancillaria sinensis G. B. Sowerby II, 1859 (original combination)

= Amalda sinensis =

Species of gastropod

Amalda sinensis is a species of sea snail, a marine gastropod mollusk in the family Ancillariidae.

== Description ==
The length of the shell attains 16 mm.

(Original description) A small white shell, resembling Amalda marginata, but much narrower, and with the varix narrower and more obliquely plicated.

== Distribution ==
This marine species occurs off Japan, the Philippines and off Borneo (Malaysia).
