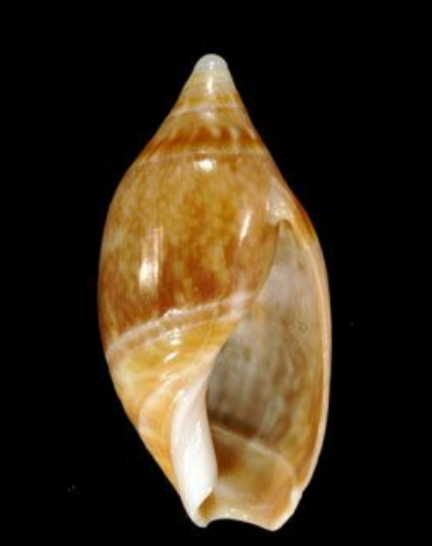
- Shell of Amalda obesa (preserved specimen at the Natural History Museum, Rotterdam)

Scientific classification
- Kingdom: Animalia
- Phylum: Mollusca
- Class: Gastropoda
- Subclass: Caenogastropoda
- Order: Neogastropoda
- Family: Ancillariidae
- Genus: Amalda
- Species: A. obesa

Binomial name
- Amalda obesa (G.B. Sowerby II, 1859)

Synonyms
- Ancilla capensis Gray, 1865; Ancilla obesa (G. B. Sowerby II, 1859); Ancillaria obesa G. B. Sowerby II, 1859 (original combination)

= Amalda obesa =

Species of gastropod

Amalda obesa is a species of sea snail, a marine gastropod mollusk in the family Ancillariidae.

== Description ==
The length of the shell attains 18.8 mm.

(Original description in Latin) The shell is oval and inflated. It is pale with dark mottling and a central dark band. The spire is short and pyramidal, with the whorls that have defined edges. The aperture is large and features a single tooth, while the small varix is white.

This species is more obese than Amalda oblonga, with a shorter spire. The middle of the body whorl has a broad brown band, above and below which are rows of brown spots; the margination is also variegated.

== Distribution ==
This marine species occurs off Port Elizabeth, South Africa and off Southern Mozambique.
