= Conus keatii =

Scientific classification
- Kingdom: Animalia
- Phylum: Mollusca
- Class: Gastropoda
- Subclass: Caenogastropoda
- Order: Neogastropoda
- Superfamily: Conoidea
- Family: Conidae
- Genus: Conus
- Species: C. keatii

Binomial name
- Conus keatii G. B. Sowerby II, 1858

Synonyms
- Conus (Phasmoconus) keatii G. B. Sowerby II, 1858; Phasmoconus (Graphiconus) keatii (G. B. Sowerby II, 1858)

Species of gastropod

Conus keatii is a species of sea snail, a marine gastropod mollusk, in the family Conidae, the cone snails and their allies.
