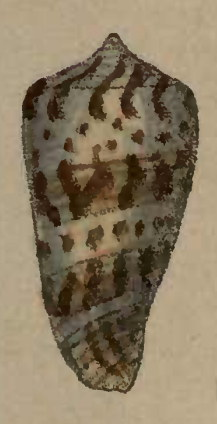
- Drawing of a shell of Conus straturatus

Scientific classification
- Kingdom: Animalia
- Phylum: Mollusca
- Class: Gastropoda
- Subclass: Caenogastropoda
- Order: Neogastropoda
- Superfamily: Conoidea
- Family: Conidae
- Genus: Conus
- Species: C. straturatus

Binomial name
- Conus straturatus G. B. Sowerby II, 1865

Synonyms
- Asprella straturatus (G. B. Sowerby II, 1865); Conus (Phasmoconus) straturatus G. B. Sowerby II, 1865 · accepted, alternate representation; Conus albospira E. A. Smith, 1880

= Conus straturatus =

Species of sea snail

Conus straturatus is a species of sea snail, a marine gastropod mollusk in the family Conidae, the cone snails, cone shells or cones.

These snails are predatory and venomous. They are capable of stinging humans.

== Description ==
The size of the shell varies between 29 mm and 39 mm. The shell shows interrupted longitudinal chestnut markings forming bands upon an ash-blue ground. The moderate spire is smooth. The body whorl is encircled below by distant grooves.

== Distribution ==
This marine species occurs in the southwest Pacific Ocean.
