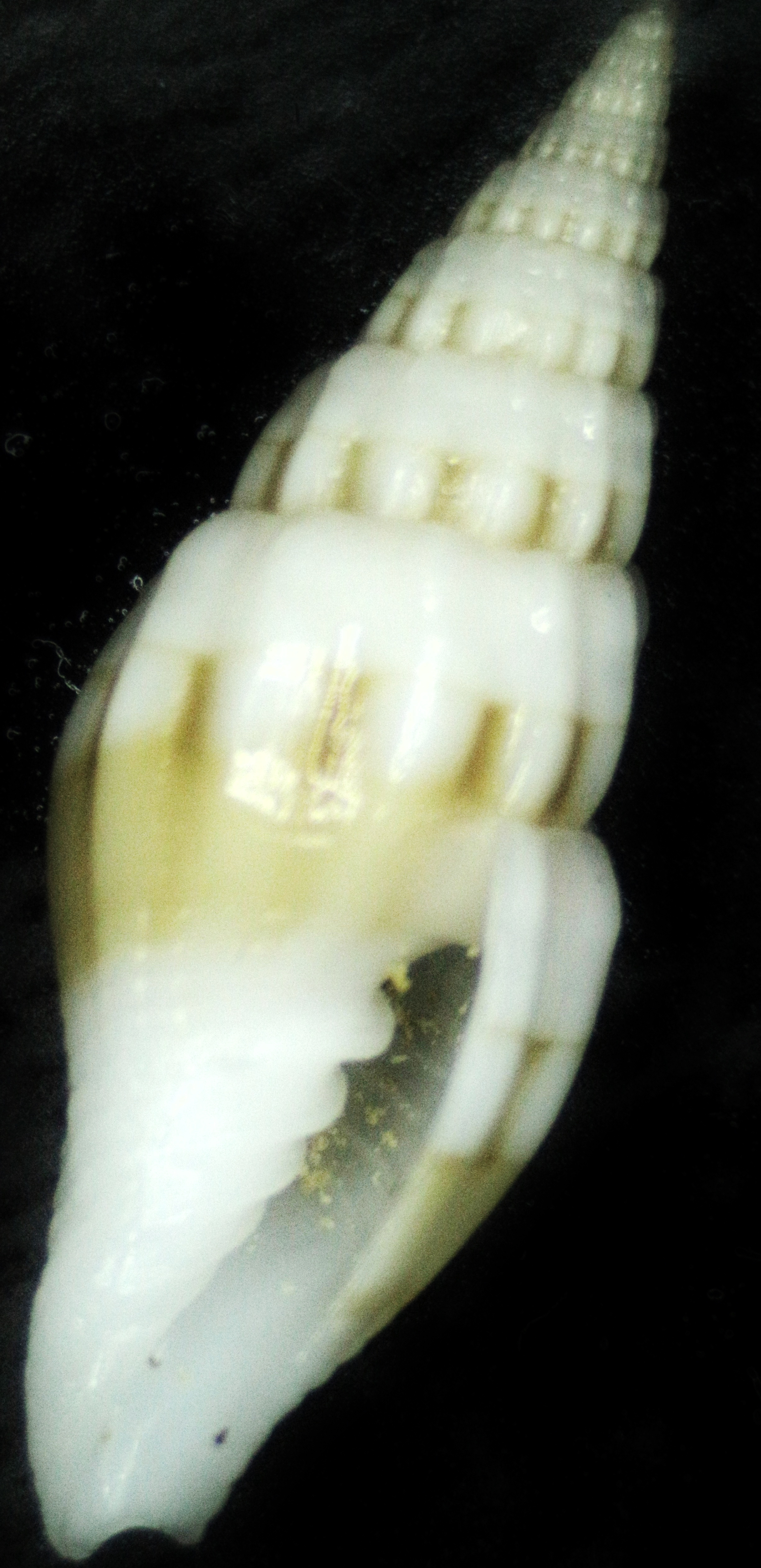
- Shell of Vexillum interstriatum

Scientific classification
- Kingdom: Animalia
- Phylum: Mollusca
- Class: Gastropoda
- Subclass: Caenogastropoda
- Order: Neogastropoda
- Superfamily: Turbinelloidea
- Family: Costellariidae
- Genus: Vexillum
- Species: V. interstriatum

Binomial name
- Vexillum interstriatum (Sowerby II, 1870)

Synonyms
- Mitra interstriata G. B. Sowerby II, 1870 (original combination); Mitra stephana Cate, J. 1963; Mitra tortulosa Lamarck, 1811; Vexillum (Vexillum) interstriatum (G. B. Sowerby II, 1870) ·

= Vexillum interstriatum =

Species of gastropod

Vexillum interstriatum is a species of small sea snail, marine gastropod mollusk in the family Costellariidae, the ribbed miters.

== Description ==
The length of the shell varies between 18 mm and 38 mm.

The longitudinal ribs are smooth, distant, the interstices with spiral striae. The shell is white, banded with orange, maculated with chestnut between the ribs.

== Distribution ==
This species occurs off the Philippines, Vietnam, Indonesia, Hawaii; also off Papua New Guinea and Queensland, Australia.
