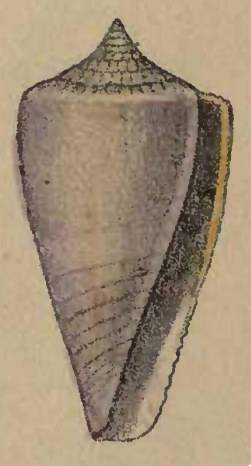
- Drawing of a shell of Conus submarginatus

Scientific classification
- Kingdom: Animalia
- Phylum: Mollusca
- Class: Gastropoda
- Subclass: Caenogastropoda
- Order: Neogastropoda
- Superfamily: Conoidea
- Family: Conidae
- Genus: Conus
- Species: C. submarginatus

Binomial name
- Conus submarginatus G. B. Sowerby II, 1870

Synonyms
- Austroconus submarginatus G. B. Sowerby II, 1870

= Conus submarginatus =

Species of sea snail

Conus submarginatus is a species of sea snail, a marine gastropod mollusk in the family Conidae, the cone snails and their allies. This is a nomen dubium.

Like all species within the genus Conus, these snails are predatory and venomous. They are capable of stinging humans, therefore live ones should be handled carefully or not at all.

== Description ==
The size of the shell varies between 20 mm and 45 mm. The narrow shell shows a raised carinate spire. The body whorl is attenuate and closely sulcate in front. Its color is yellowish white. The aperture is rosy.

== Distribution ==
This marine species occurs off New Caledonia
