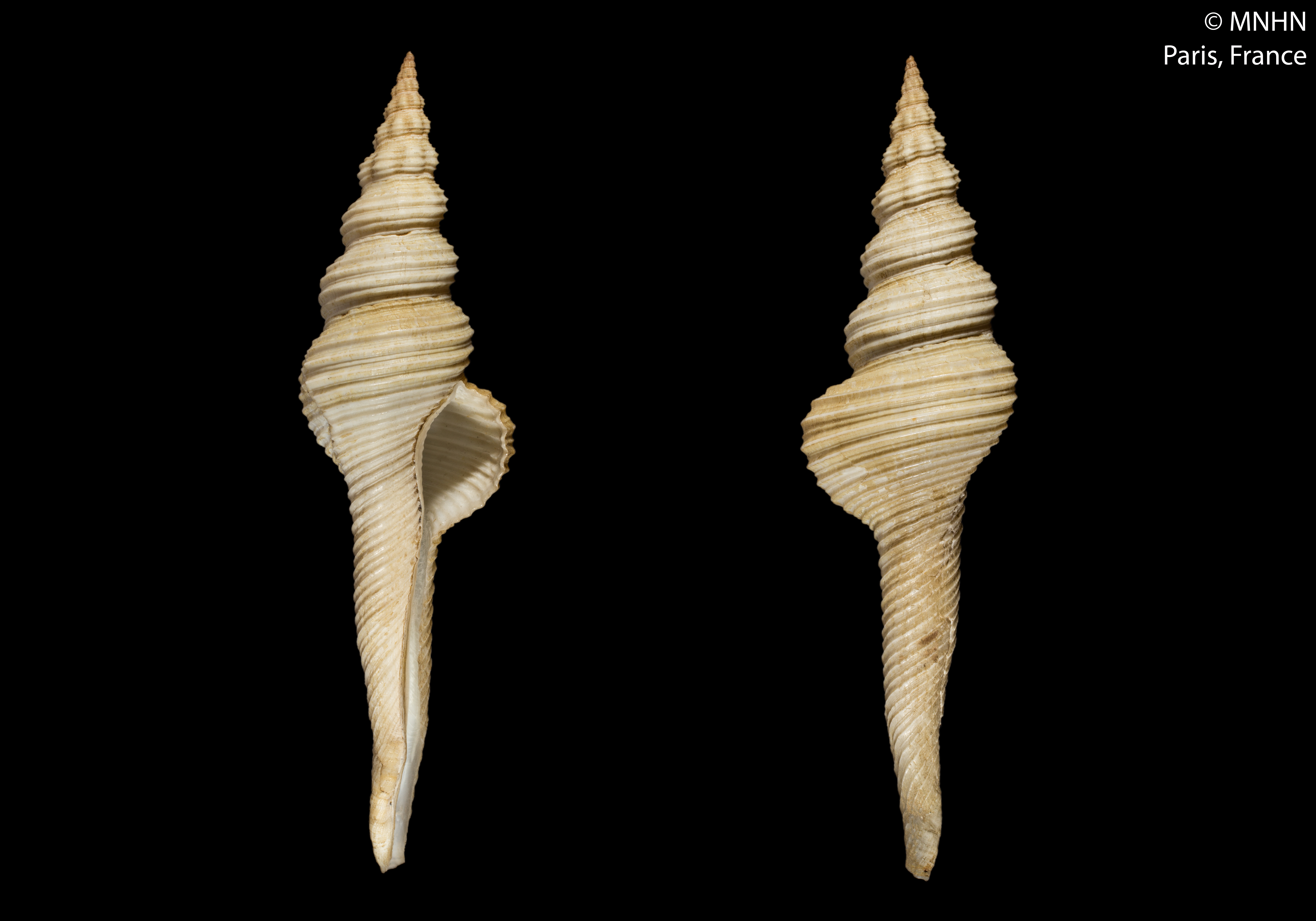
- Shell of Aristofusus couei (syntype at MNHN, Paris)

Scientific classification
- Kingdom: Animalia
- Phylum: Mollusca
- Class: Gastropoda
- Subclass: Caenogastropoda
- Order: Neogastropoda
- Family: Fasciolariidae
- Genus: Aristofusus; Vermeij & Snyder, 2018

Type species
- Fusus excavatus Sowerby II, 1880

= Aristofusus =

Genus of gastropods

Aristofusus is a genus of sea snails in the family Fasciolariidae.

== Species ==
Species within the genus Aristofusus include:

- Aristofusus benjamini (Hadorn, 1997)
- Aristofusus couei (Petit de la Saussaye, 1853)
- Aristofusus excavatus (Sowerby II, 1880)
- Aristofusus helenae (Bartsch, 1939)
- † Aristofusus henikeri (G. B. Sowerby I, 1850)
- † Aristofusus isthmicus (Böse, 1910)
- † Aristofusus miocosmius (Olsson, 1922)
- Aristofusus stegeri (Lyons, 1978)
- † Aristofusus vonderschmidti (Rutsch, 1934)
- † Aristofusus waltonensis (J. A. Gardner, 1944)

Synonyms

- † Aristofusus henekeni (G. B. Sowerby I, 1850): synonym of † Aristofusus henikeri (G. B. Sowerby I, 1850) (misspelling - incorrect subsequent spelling)
