= Sowerby =

Sowerby may refer to:

== People ==
- Sowerby (surname)

== Places ==
- Sowerby, North Yorkshire, England
- Sowerby, Ontario, Canada in Huron Shores
- Sowerby, West Yorkshire, England
- Sowerby (UK Parliament constituency), which elected MPs to the British House of Commons 1885–1983
- Inskip-with-Sowerby, the civil parish containing the village of Inskip, Lancashire, England
- Temple Sowerby, a village in Cumbria
- Sowerby Bridge, West Yorkshire, England
- Sowerbyshire, West Yorkshire, England
