= Fusinus laetus =

Scientific classification
- Kingdom: Animalia
- Phylum: Mollusca
- Class: Gastropoda
- Subclass: Caenogastropoda
- Order: Neogastropoda
- Family: Fasciolariidae
- Genus: Fusinus
- Species: F. laetus

Binomial name
- Fusinus laetus (G.B. Sowerby II, 1880)

Synonyms
- Fusus laetus G.B. Sowerby II, 1880

Species of gastropod

Fusinus laetus is a species of sea snail, a marine gastropod mollusc in the family Fasciolariidae, the spindle snails, the tulip snails and their allies.
