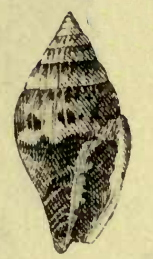
- Drawing of a shell of Vexillum mediomaculatum

Scientific classification
- Kingdom: Animalia
- Phylum: Mollusca
- Class: Gastropoda
- Subclass: Caenogastropoda
- Order: Neogastropoda
- Superfamily: Turbinelloidea
- Family: Costellariidae
- Genus: Vexillum
- Species: V. mediomaculatum

Binomial name
- Vexillum mediomaculatum (G.B. Sowerby II, 1870)

Synonyms
- Mitra aperta Sowerby II & Sowerby III, 1874; Mitra mediomaculata G. B. Sowerby II, 1870 (original combination); Pusia mediomaculatum G.B. Sowerby III, 1870; Vexillum (Pusia) mediomaculatum (G. B. Sowerby II, 1870) ·

= Vexillum mediomaculatum =

Species of gastropod

Vexillum mediomaculatum is a species of small sea snail, marine gastropod mollusk in the family Costellariidae, the ribbed miters.

== Description ==
The length of the shell attains 16 mm.

The shell is somewhat indistinctly plicately ribbed. The ribs are smooth, wide and close together. The interstices show revolving striae. The sculpture altogether is obsolete on the back of the body whorl. The shell is rich chestnut-brown, broadly white-banded, with a row of square, regular brown spots in the centre of the band.

== Distribution ==
This marine species occurs off Hawaii and Mauritius.
