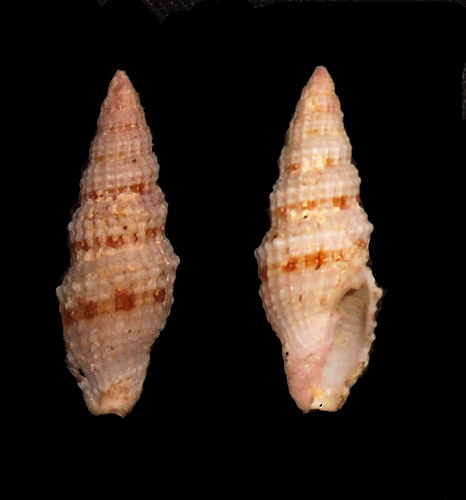
- Vexillum corbicula

Scientific classification
- Kingdom: Animalia
- Phylum: Mollusca
- Class: Gastropoda
- Subclass: Caenogastropoda
- Order: Neogastropoda
- Superfamily: Turbinelloidea
- Family: Costellariidae
- Genus: Vexillum
- Species: V. corbicula

Binomial name
- Vexillum corbicula (G.B. Sowerby II, 1870)

Synonyms
- Mitra corbicula G. B. Sowerby II, 1870; Mitra diamesa Hervier, 1897; Vexillum (Costellaria) corbicula (G. B. Sowerby II, 1870); Vexillum diamesa (Hervier, 1897)

= Vexillum corbicula =

Species of gastropod

Vexillum corbicula is a species of small sea snail, marine gastropod mollusk in the family Costellariidae, the ribbed miters.

== Description ==
The shell size varies between 14 mm and 20 mm.

The shell is yellowish white, shaded with yellowish brown. The tubercles of the shoulder angle are tipped with chestnut, forming a necklacelike row. The interior of the aperture is light yellowish. The ribs and the revolving riblets are both close, forming granules.

== Distribution ==
This species occurs in the Indian Ocean off Madagascar and the Mascarene Basin, and in the Pacific Ocean off Hawaii; also off the Philippines.
