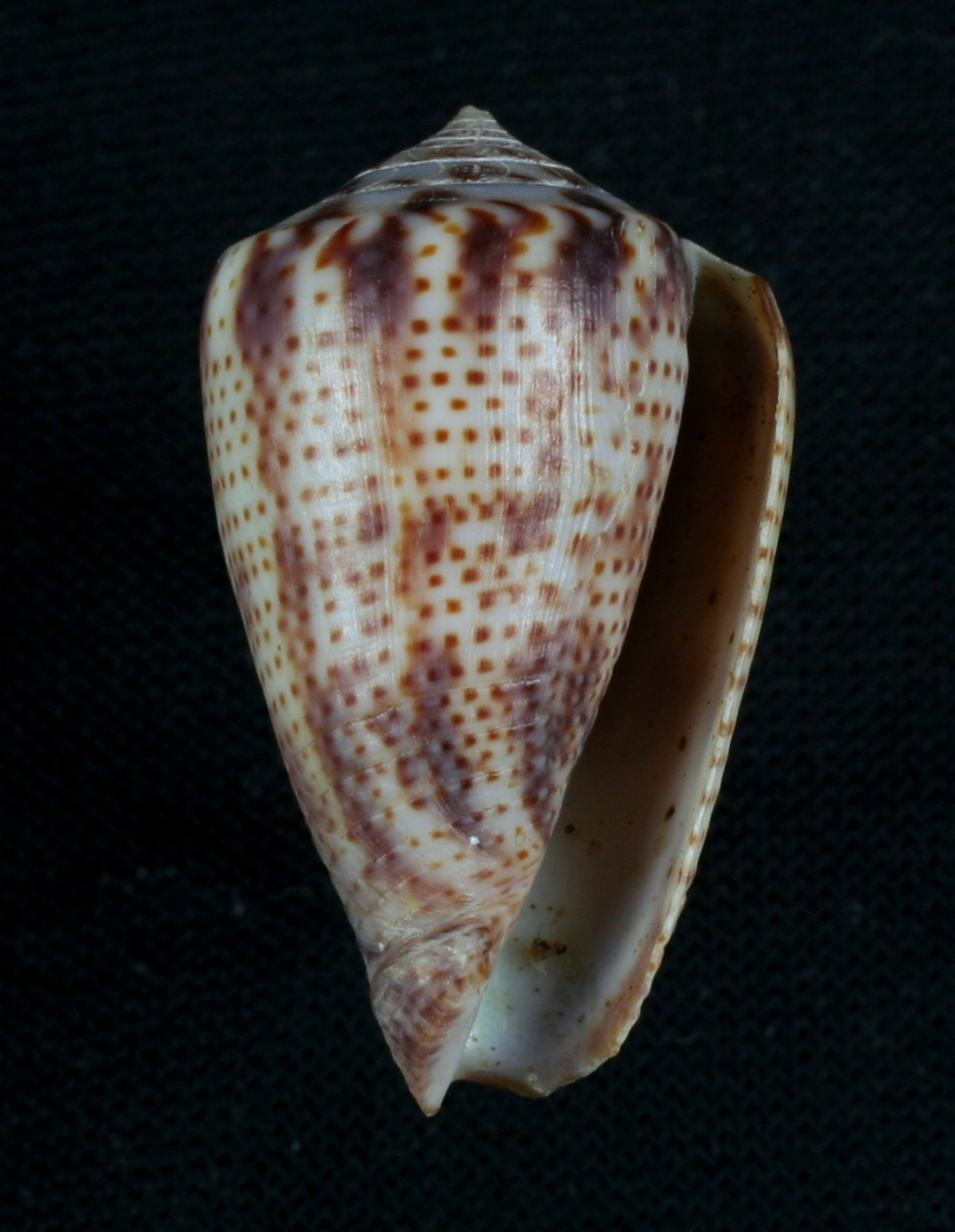
- Apertural view of shell of Conasprella perplexa (G. B. Sowerby II, 1857)

Scientific classification
- Kingdom: Animalia
- Phylum: Mollusca
- Class: Gastropoda
- Subclass: Caenogastropoda
- Order: Neogastropoda
- Superfamily: Conoidea
- Family: Conidae
- Genus: Conasprella
- Species: C. perplexa

Binomial name
- Conasprella perplexa (G. B. Sowerby II, 1857)

Synonyms
- Conasprella (Ximeniconus) perplexa (G. B. Sowerby II, 1857) · accepted, alternate representation; Conus perplexus G. B. Sowerby II, 1857 (original combination); Perplexiconus perplexus (G. B. Sowerby II, 1857)

= Conasprella perplexa =

Species of gastropod

Conasprella perplexa is a species of sea snail, a marine gastropod mollusk in the family Conidae, the cone snails and their allies.

Like all species within the genus Conasprella, these snails are predatory and venomous. They are capable of stinging humans, therefore live ones should be handled carefully or not at all.

They are known as cono perplejo in Mexico.

== Description ==
They are a yellowish-white color with variable spiral rows of dots and dashes. Their aperture is purple. The shell is covered with a thin periostracum.

The size of the shell varies between 15 mm and 30 mm.

== Distribution ==
This marine species occurs off Baja California, Mexico to Peru; and off the Galápagos Islands.

== Gallery ==
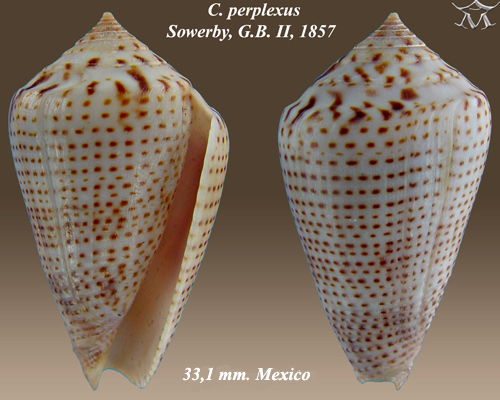
Conasprella perplexa Sowerby, G.B. II, 1857

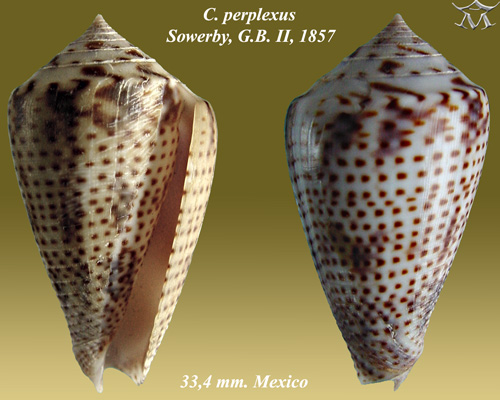
Conasprella perplexa Sowerby, G.B. II, 1857

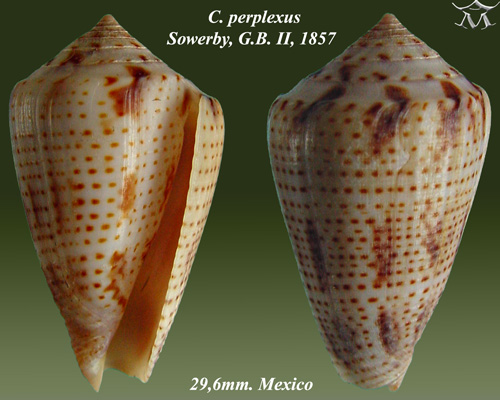
Conasprella perplexa Sowerby, G.B. II, 1857
