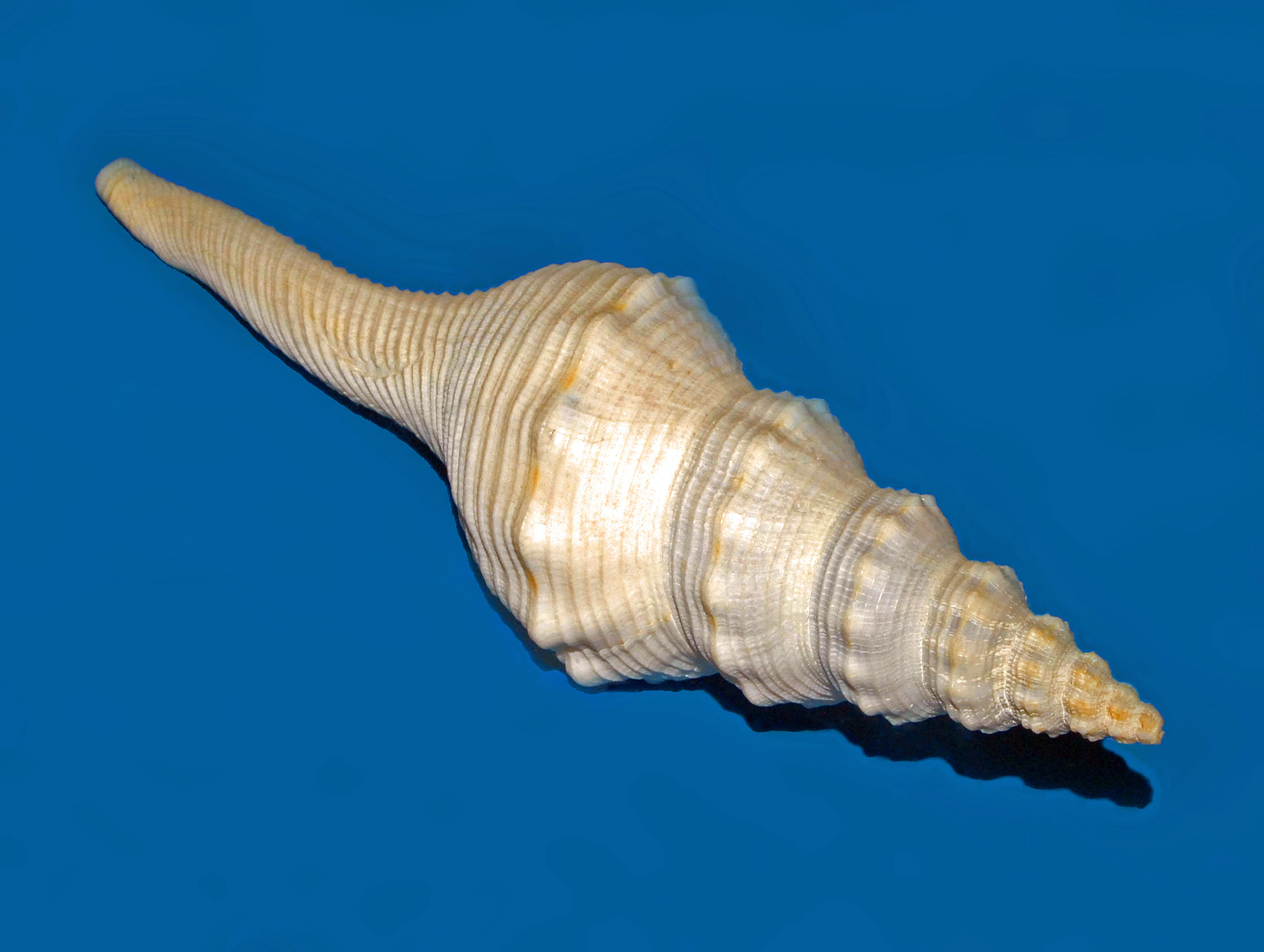
- Shell of Aristofusus excavatus from Mexico at the Museo Civico di Storia Naturale di Milano

Scientific classification
- Kingdom: Animalia
- Phylum: Mollusca
- Class: Gastropoda
- Subclass: Caenogastropoda
- Order: Neogastropoda
- Family: Fasciolariidae
- Genus: Aristofusus
- Species: A. excavatus

Binomial name
- Aristofusus excavatus (Sowerby II, 1880)

Synonyms
- Fusinus eucosmius Dall, 1889; Fusinus excavatus (G. B. Sowerby II, 1880) (original combination); Fusus eucosmius Dall, 1889; Fusus excavatus G.B. Sowerby II, 1880

= Aristofusus excavatus =

Species of gastropod

Aristofusus excavatus, common name apricot spindle, is a species of sea snail, a marine gastropod mollusk in the family Fasciolariidae, the spindle snails, the tulip snails and their allies.

== Description ==
Aristofusus excavatus has a shell reaching a size of 60 – 86 mm. The surface of this spindle-shaped shell is yellowish, with darker yellowish areas.

(Original description in Latin) The shell is slender and fusiform, with a tawny (fulvous) base color.

It is characterized by prominent spiral lirae (ridges) with finer interstriae (fine grooves between the ridges). The shell is also adorned with prominent, widely spaced axial ribs (costae). These ribs are tuberculate-lirate (ridged and bearing distinct nodules/tubercles).

The shell comprises 10 prominent whorls. These whorls are distinctly and deeply excavated or channeled just below the suture.

== Distribution ==
This species can be found in southeastern United States and from the Gulf of Mexico to northeastern Brazil. It lives on sandy and mud bottoms at depths from 30 to 160 m.
