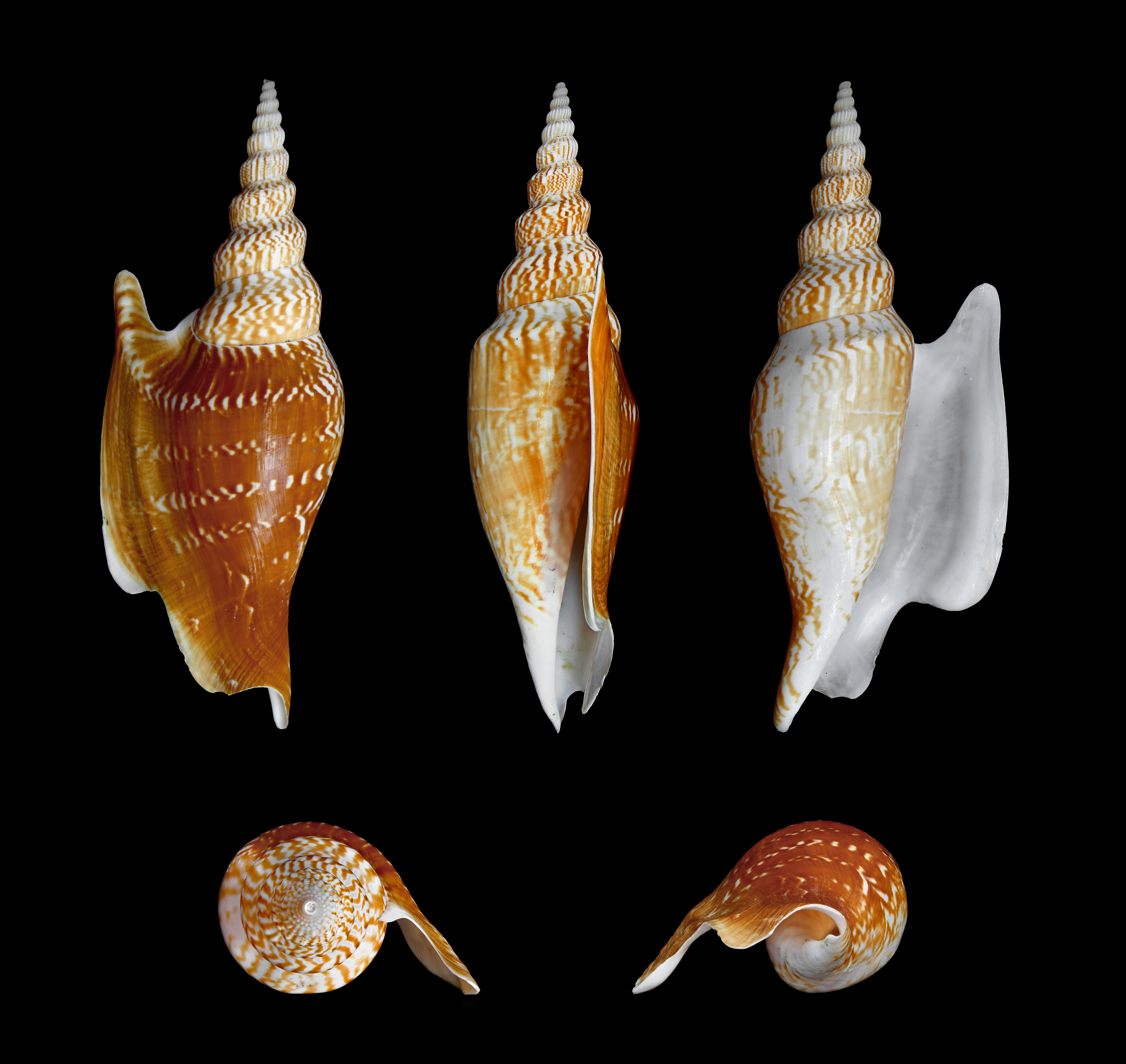
- Five views of a shell of Mirabilistrombus listeri

Scientific classification
- Kingdom: Animalia
- Phylum: Mollusca
- Class: Gastropoda
- Subclass: Caenogastropoda
- Order: Littorinimorpha
- Family: Strombidae
- Genus: Mirabilistrombus
- Species: M. listeri

Binomial name
- Mirabilistrombus listeri (T. Gray, 1852)

Synonyms
- Strombus listeri T. Gray, 1852; Strombus mirabilis Sowerby II, 1870

= Mirabilistrombus listeri =

Species of gastropod

Mirabilistrombus listeri, common name the Lister's snail, is a species of sea snail, a marine gastropod mollusk in the family Strombidae, the true conches.

== Description ==
The shell size varies between 90 mm and 160 mm. When the animal is mature, the body whorl takes up over 50% of the shell's height. The pronounced projection at the end of the apertural lip is characteristic of the species (Dance, 2002).

== Distribution ==
This species is distributed in the Northwest Indian Ocean and the Andaman Sea. It is a deep-water species. Formerly very uncommon, its population has been increasing in recent years (Dance, 2002).
