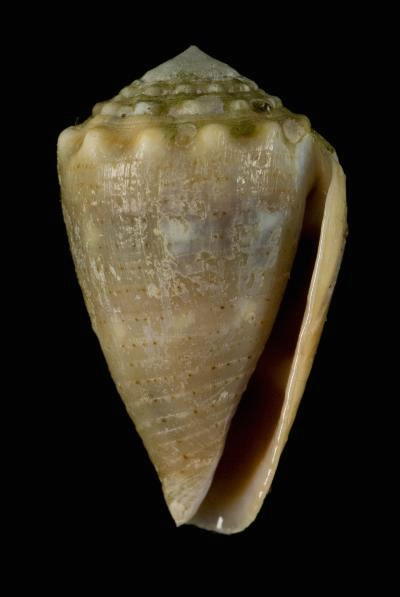
- Shell of Conus aristophanes (museum specimen at MNHN, Paris)

Scientific classification
- Kingdom: Animalia
- Phylum: Mollusca
- Class: Gastropoda
- Subclass: Caenogastropoda
- Order: Neogastropoda
- Superfamily: Conoidea
- Family: Conidae
- Genus: Conus
- Species: C. aristophanes

Binomial name
- Conus aristophanes G. B. Sowerby II, 1857

Synonyms
- Conus (Virroconus) aristophanes G. B. Sowerby II, 1857 accepted, alternate representation; Miliariconus aristophanes (G. B. Sowerby II, 1857)

= Conus aristophanes =

Species of sea snail

Conus aristophanes is a species of sea snail, a marine gastropod mollusk in the family Conidae, the cone snails and their allies.

These snails are predatory and venomous. They are capable of stinging humans, therefore live ones should be handled carefully or not at all.

== Description ==
The size of the shell varies between 18 mm and 47 mm. The shell is violaceous gray, somewhat clouded with pink-white. The revolving lines are milk-white, interrupted by chestnut short dashes and spots. The interior of the aperture is chocolate, with a central white band. spire is more or less raised, striate or sometimes nearly smooth, with or without tubercles. The body whorl is striate, the striae usually granulous towards the base, and sometimes throughout.

== Distribution ==
This marine species occurs off the Philippines; Papua New Guinea, Tahiti and Fiji; also off Mozambique.
