= Royal Asiatic Society China =

Learned society based in Shanghai and Beijing

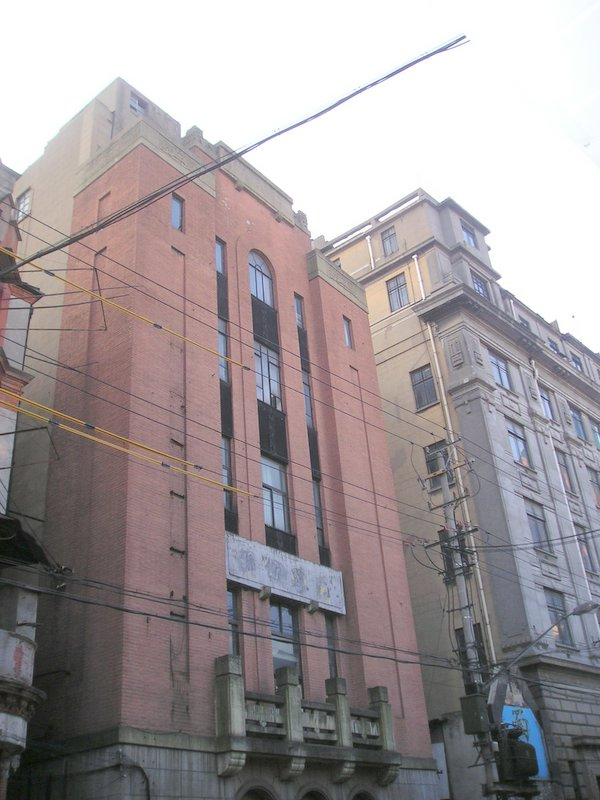
Offices in 2007

The Royal Asiatic Society China is a learned society based in Shanghai and Beijing, China.

It was established in Shanghai in 1857 by a small group of British and American expatriates as the Shanghai Literary and Scientific Society, and within a year had achieved affiliation with the Royal Asiatic Society of Great Britain and Ireland and become the North China Branch of the Royal Asiatic Society (NCBRAS). However, following the death of the society's first president, American missionary Elijah Coleman Bridgman, in 1861 the society became moribund, but was rescued in 1864 by Sir Harry Smith Parkes, the British Consul.

The Society's stated intention was to study and disseminate knowledge of China and surrounding nations by publishing a journal and establishing a library and museum. The first journal was published in 1858 and thereafter for 90 years. The Society's original home comprised a ground-floor reading room, library and lecture hall, but was expanded in 1874 to house a museum on the floor above. In 1930 the building was condemned and although funds were raised to build new premises, the Great Depression and the Second Sino-Japanese War conspired to prevent any progress. Although the society struggled on it was finally wound up in 1952. The book collection went to the Shanghai Library and most of the museum exhibits to the Shanghai Natural History Museum.

In 2006 the society was re-established in Hangzhou and transferred to Shanghai the following year as the Royal Asiatic Society in Shanghai. The Journal has been resurrected and a growing library and museum opened to members and scholars.

In 2013 a chapter was established in Beijing as the Royal Asiatic Society in Beijing.

== Presidents ==
North China Branch of the RAS 1857-1952

- 1857–1861: Rev Elijah Coleman Bridgman
- ?1859–: Thomas Taylor Meadows
- 1864–: Harry Smith Parkes
- c.1885: Herbert Allen Giles
- c.1910 Sir Pelham Warren
- 1911: John Calvin Ferguson
- 1913–1919: Sir Everard H. Fraser
- 1919–: Arthur Stanley
- 1935–1940: Arthur de Carle Sowerby

RAS China in Shanghai 2007-

- 2007–2011: Peter Hibbard
- 2011-2013: Katy Gow
- 2013–: Nenad Djordjevic

== See also ==
- Royal Asiatic Society Hong Kong Branch
