= Heilprinia dowiana =

Scientific classification
- Kingdom: Animalia
- Phylum: Mollusca
- Class: Gastropoda
- Subclass: Caenogastropoda
- Order: Neogastropoda
- Family: Fasciolariidae
- Genus: Heilprinia
- Species: H. dowiana

Binomial name
- Heilprinia dowiana (Olsson, 1954)

Synonyms
- Fusinus (Heilprinia) dowianus Olsson, 1954 (basionym); Fusinus dowianus Olsson, 1954 (original combination)

Species of gastropod

Heilprinia dowiana is a species of sea snail, a marine gastropod mollusc in the family Fasciolariidae, the spindle snails, the tulip snails and their allies.

== Distribution ==
This species occurs in the Gulf of Mexico off Honduras.
