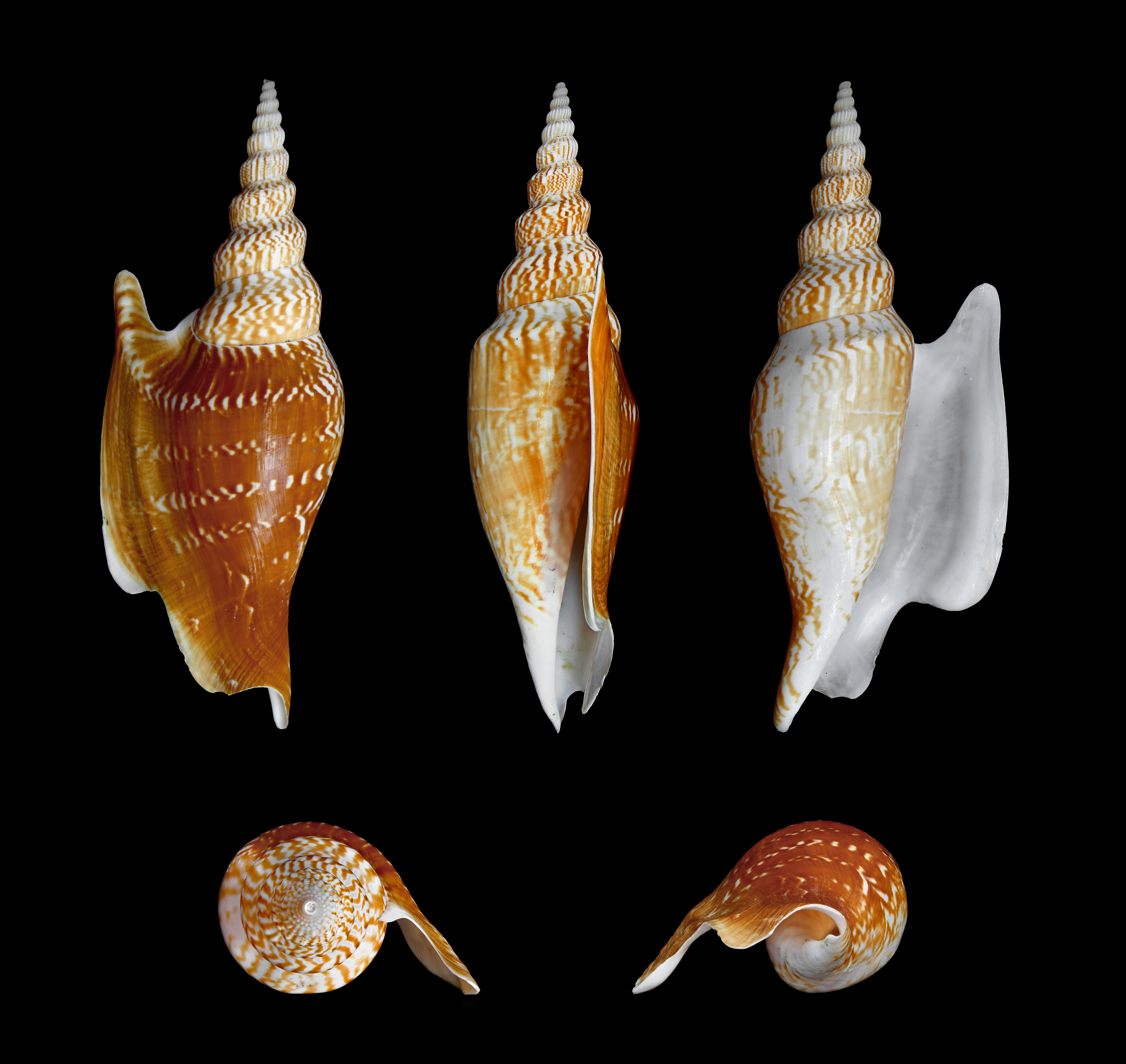
- Five views of a shell of Mirabilistrombus listeri

Scientific classification
- Kingdom: Animalia
- Phylum: Mollusca
- Class: Gastropoda
- Subclass: Caenogastropoda
- Order: Littorinimorpha
- Superfamily: Stromboidea
- Family: Strombidae
- Genus: Mirabilistrombus; Kronenberg, 1998

Type species
- Strombus listeri T. Gray, 1852

= Mirabilistrombus =

Genus of gastropods

Mirabilistrombus is a monospecific genus of sea snails, marine gastropod mollusks in the family Strombidae, the true conchs.

== Species ==
Species within the genus Mirabilistrombus include:

- Mirabilistrombus listeri (T. Gray, 1852)
