= Heilprinia timessa =

Scientific classification
- Kingdom: Animalia
- Phylum: Mollusca
- Class: Gastropoda
- Subclass: Caenogastropoda
- Order: Neogastropoda
- Family: Fasciolariidae
- Genus: Heilprinia
- Species: H. timessa

Binomial name
- Heilprinia timessa (Dall, 1889)

Synonyms
- Fusinus timessus (Dall, 1889); Fusus timessus Dall, 1889; Heilprinia lindae Petuch, 1987

Species of gastropod

Heilprinia timessa is a species of sea snail, a marine gastropod mollusc in the family Fasciolariidae, the spindle snails, the tulip snails and their allies.

== Distribution ==
This marine species occurs off the Florida Keys.
