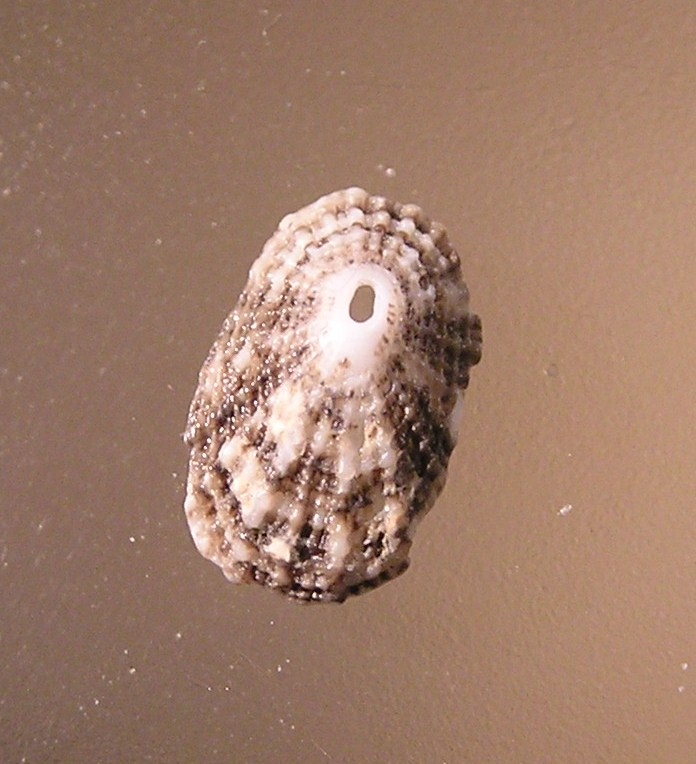

Scientific classification
- Kingdom: Animalia
- Phylum: Mollusca
- Class: Gastropoda
- Subclass: Vetigastropoda
- Order: Lepetellida
- Family: Fissurellidae
- Genus: Diodora
- Species: D. ruppellii

Binomial name
- Diodora ruppellii (G.B. Sowerby I, 1835)

Synonyms
- Fissurella nigriadiata Reeve, 1850; Fissurella reticulata Liénard, 1877

= Diodora ruppellii =

Species of gastropod

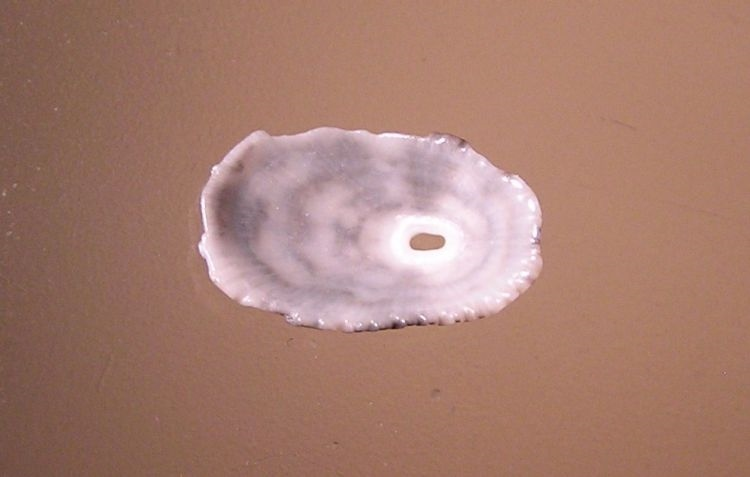
Diodora ruepellii, underside

Diodora ruppellii, Rüppell's keyhole limpet, is a species of sea snail, a marine gastropod mollusc in the family Fissurellidae, the keyhole limpets.

== Description ==
Diodora ruppellii has a shell with a whitish exterior marked with a radial pattern of dark blotches and a white interior surface marked with a faint pattern similar to the exterior. The shell is asteeply conical, elongated oval with a hole at the apex, which is roughly a third of the length of the shell from its anterior end. There are 20 to 25 radiating ribs on the exterior surface of the shell with some smaller ribs between them; the growth ridges are not as developed as the ribs and form knobs at where they intersect. The edges of the apical hole have conspicuous crenulations where they meet the ribs, the notches between the crenulations continue a short distance towards the inside of the shell. The shell can be up to 20 mm long, although 15mm is the most common length, and 10 mm high, in Red Sea specimens.

== Distribution ==
Diodora ruppellii has an Indo-Pacific distribution occurring in the Red Sea and along the east African coasts as far south as KwaZulu-Natal and east through the Indian Ocean and Pacific Ocean to Hawaii. It was recorded in the Suez Canal in 1905 and reaching the Mediterranean in 1948 when it was recorded off the coast of Israel and had spread to south-eastern Turkey by 1995.

== Ecology ==
Species in the genus Diodora feed on sponges from the undersides of rocks and boulders. Diodora ruppellii is normally found in the intertidal zone on rocky shores but has been dredged up from gravel substrates.
