= Aristofusus stegeri =

Scientific classification
- Kingdom: Animalia
- Phylum: Mollusca
- Class: Gastropoda
- Subclass: Caenogastropoda
- Order: Neogastropoda
- Family: Fasciolariidae
- Genus: Aristofusus
- Species: A. stegeri

Binomial name
- Aristofusus stegeri (Lyons, 1978)

Synonyms
- Fusinus stegeri Lyons, 1978 (original combination)

Species of gastropod

Aristofusus stegeri, common name the ornamented spindle, is a species of sea snail, a marine gastropod mollusk in the family Fasciolariidae, the spindle snails, the tulip snails and their allies.

== Distribution ==
This species occurs in the Gulf of Mexico off Florida.
