= Sowerby family =

British family of naturalists

- Family
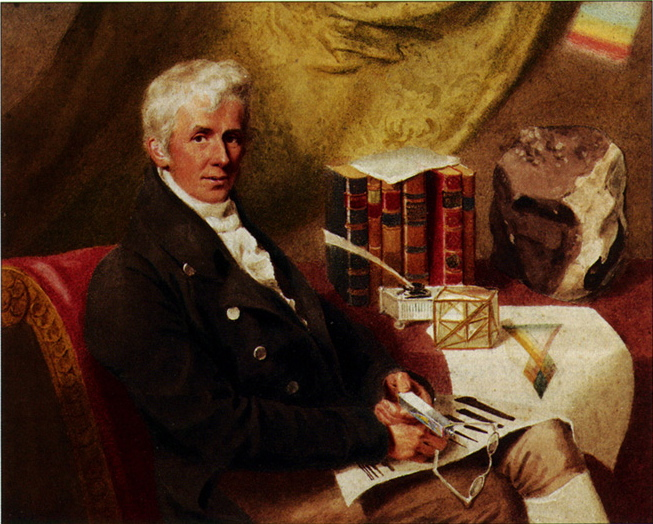
- Painting of James Sowerby (1816)
- Country: United Kingdom
- Founded: 1757
- Founder: James Sowerby

The Sowerby family (/ˈsoʊərbi, ˈsaʊərbi/) was a British family of several generations of naturalists, illustrators, botanists, and zoologists active from the late 18th century to the mid twentieth century.

- James Sowerby (1757–1822)
  - James De Carle Sowerby (1787–1871)
    - James Sowerby (1815–1834)
    - William Sowerby (1827–1906)
    - Joseph Sowerby (1829–ca.1871)
      - Rev. Arthur Sowerby (1857–?)
        - Arthur de Carle Sowerby (1885–1954)
  - George Brettingham Sowerby I (1788–1854)
    - George Brettingham Sowerby II (1812–1884)
    - Charlotte Caroline Sowerby (1820–1865)
      - George Brettingham Sowerby III (1843–1921)
  - Charles Edward Sowerby (1795–1842)
    - John Edward Sowerby (1825-1870)

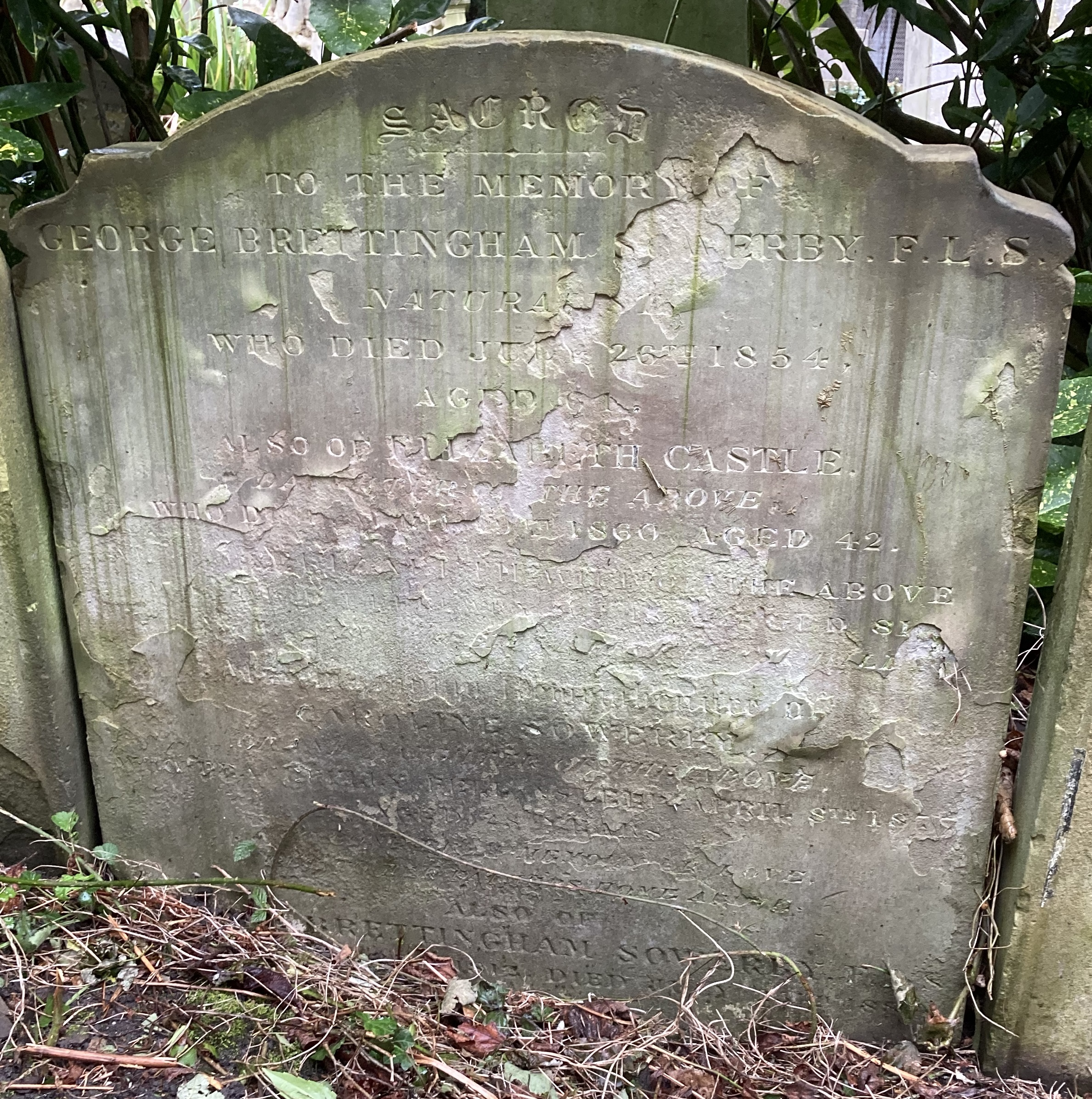
Family grave of George Brettingham Sowerby I, Charlotte Caroline Sowerby and George Brettingham Sowerby II in Highgate Cemetery

The three George Sowerbys produced major works on molluscs and their systematics. Together, they introduced numerous (sometimes the number 5000 is mentioned) taxonomic names. Because all three of the G.B Sowerbys published extensively on the subject of conchology, it is not easy even for professional taxonomists to unravel which of the three "G.B. Sowerbys" is meant in a particular citation when the numbering system G.B. Sowerby I, II, or III is not used. Even when a date is provided, this kind of attribution is not obvious: e.g. "Sowerby, 1870" can refer to either G.B. Sowerby II or G.B. Sowerby III.

The scientific and artistic contributions of the family extended well into the 20th century. Arthur de Carle Sowerby (1885–1954), James Sowerby's great-great-grandson, explored the geography and natural history of China. One of James' grandsons, John George Sowerby (1850–1914), was an illustrator and glass-worker whose work was exhibited in the British Royal Academy, and who directed Ellison Glass Works Ltd, which during the 1880s was the world's largest producer of pressed glass. John G. Sowerby's daughter Katherine Githa (1876–1970) became a noted playwright, and Millicent Sowerby (1878–1967) was a painter and illustrator known for her children's book illustrations.
