= Aristofusus benjamini =

Scientific classification
- Kingdom: Animalia
- Phylum: Mollusca
- Class: Gastropoda
- Subclass: Caenogastropoda
- Order: Neogastropoda
- Family: Fasciolariidae
- Genus: Aristofusus
- Species: A. benjamini

Binomial name
- Aristofusus benjamini (Hadorn, 1997)

Synonyms
- Fusinus benjamini Hadorn, 1997 (original combination)

Species of gastropod

Aristofusus benjamini is a species of sea snail, a marine gastropod mollusk in the family Fasciolariidae, the spindle snails, the tulip snails and their allies.

== Distribution ==
This marine species occurs in the Caribbean Sea off Barbados, Suriname, Trinidad and Tobago, Colombia and French Guiana.
