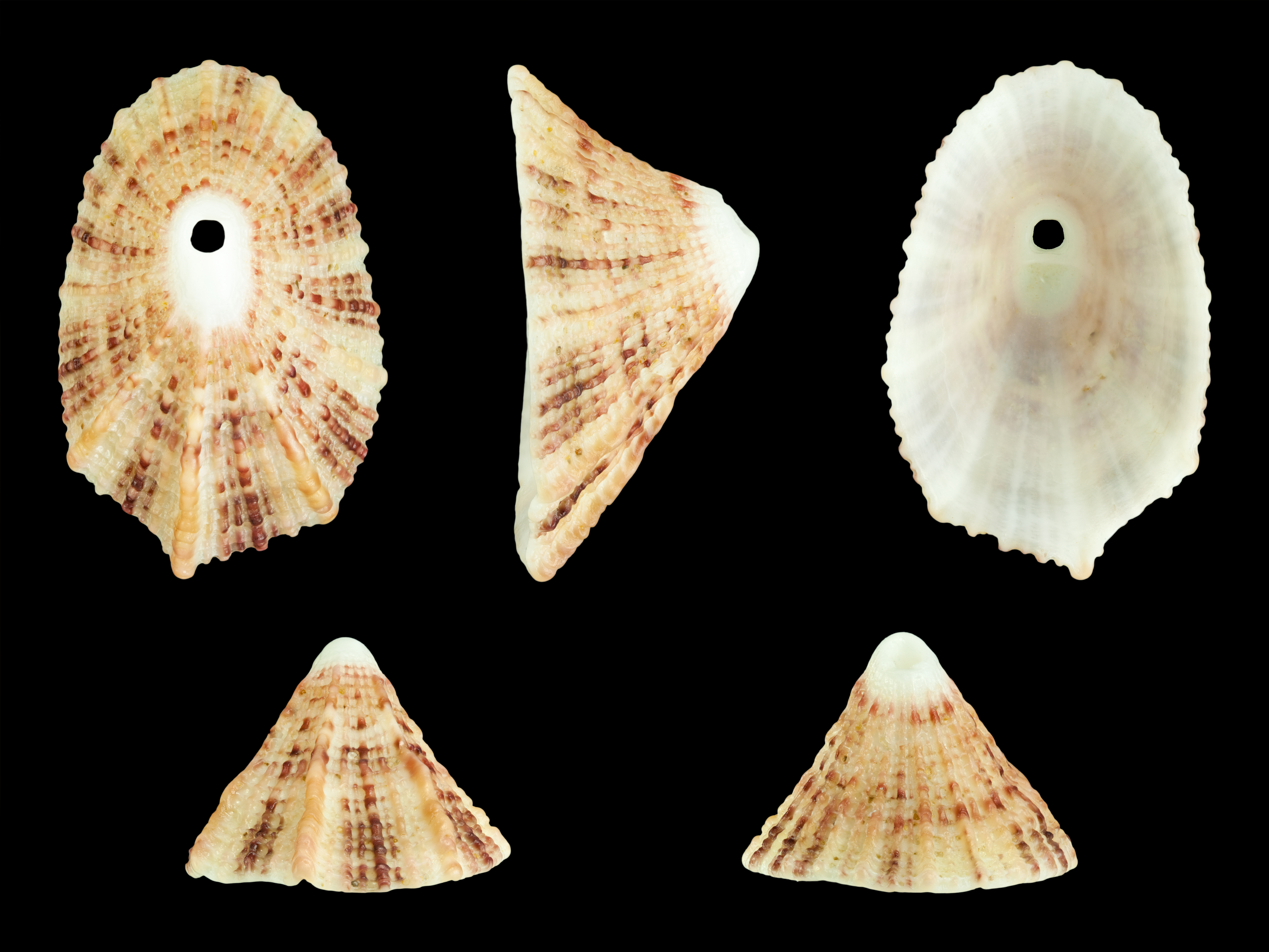

Scientific classification
- Kingdom: Animalia
- Phylum: Mollusca
- Class: Gastropoda
- Subclass: Vetigastropoda
- Order: Lepetellida
- Family: Fissurellidae
- Subfamily: Fissurellinae
- Genus: Diodora
- Species: D. calyculata

Binomial name
- Diodora calyculata (Sowerby I, 1823)

= Diodora calyculata =

Species of gastropod

Diodora calyculata is a species of sea snail, a marine gastropod mollusk in the family Fissurellidae, the keyhole limpets and slit limpets.

== Description ==
The size of the shell varies between 15 mm and 26 mm.

== Distribution ==
This species occurs in the Indian Ocean from Cape Agulhas to South Transkei, South Africa.
