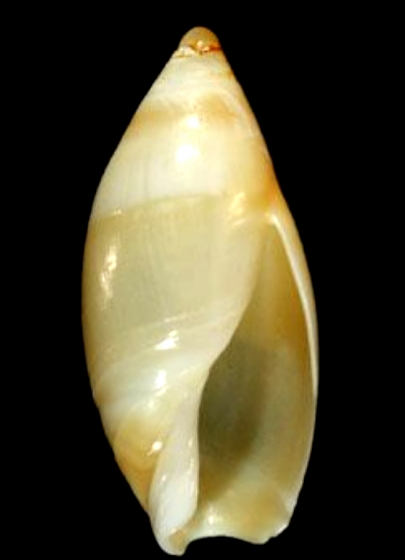
- Shell of Amalda lineata (preserved specimen in the Natural History Museum, Rotterdam)

Scientific classification
- Kingdom: Animalia
- Phylum: Mollusca
- Class: Gastropoda
- Subclass: Caenogastropoda
- Order: Neogastropoda
- Family: Ancillariidae
- Genus: Amalda
- Species: A. lineata

Binomial name
- Amalda lineata (Kiener, 1844)

Synonyms
- Ancillaria lineata Kiener, 1844

= Amalda lineata =

Species of gastropod

Amalda lineata is a species of sea snail, a marine gastropod mollusc in the family Ancillariidae.

== Description ==
The length of the shell attains 21 mm.

(Original description in Latin) The shell is small, oblong, whitish, distinctly marked with intersecting tawny lines. The spire is conical and pointed. The whorls are banded at the top, with the bands faintly jointed and spotted with brown. The body whorl is grooved at the base, with brown spots. The outer lip is smooth.

== Distribution ==
This marine species is endemic to Australia and occurs off South Australia, Victoria, and Western Australia.

== Habitat ==
Often dredged on a sand bottom, at 40–50 m. depth.
