= Charlotte Caroline Sowerby =

English painter

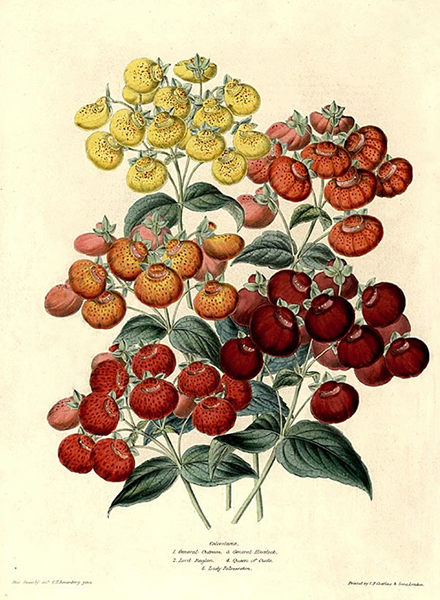
- Bouquet of 5 calceolarias by Charlotte Caroline Sowerby, published as hand-colored zincograph in The Illustrated Bouquet (1857–64)
- Born: c.1820
- Died: c.1865 (aged 44–45)
- Resting place: Highgate Cemetery
- Notable work: The Illustrated Bouquet
- Movement: Botanical illustration
- Father: George Brettingham Sowerby I
- Relatives: James Sowerby (grandfather); George Brettingham Sowerby II (brother)

Charlotte Caroline Sowerby (1820–1865) (sometimes C.C. Sowerby) was a 19th-century British scientific illustrator and a member of the extensive Sowerby family of naturalist-illustrators.

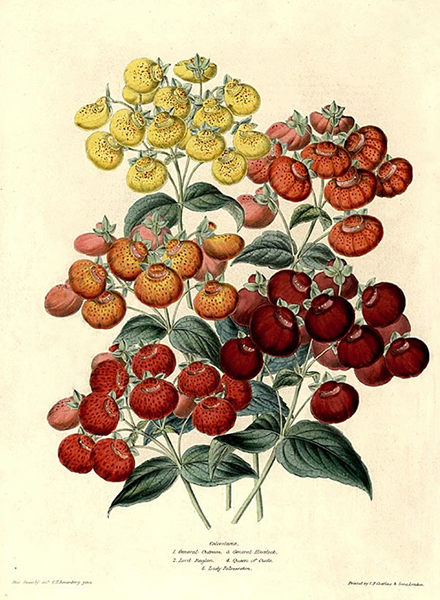
Bouquet of 5 calceolarias by Charlotte Caroline Sowerby, printed as hand-colored zincograph in The Illustrated Bouquet (1857–64). Pictured are the varieties General Outram, Lord Raglan, Lord Havelock, Queen of Oude, and Lady Palmerston.

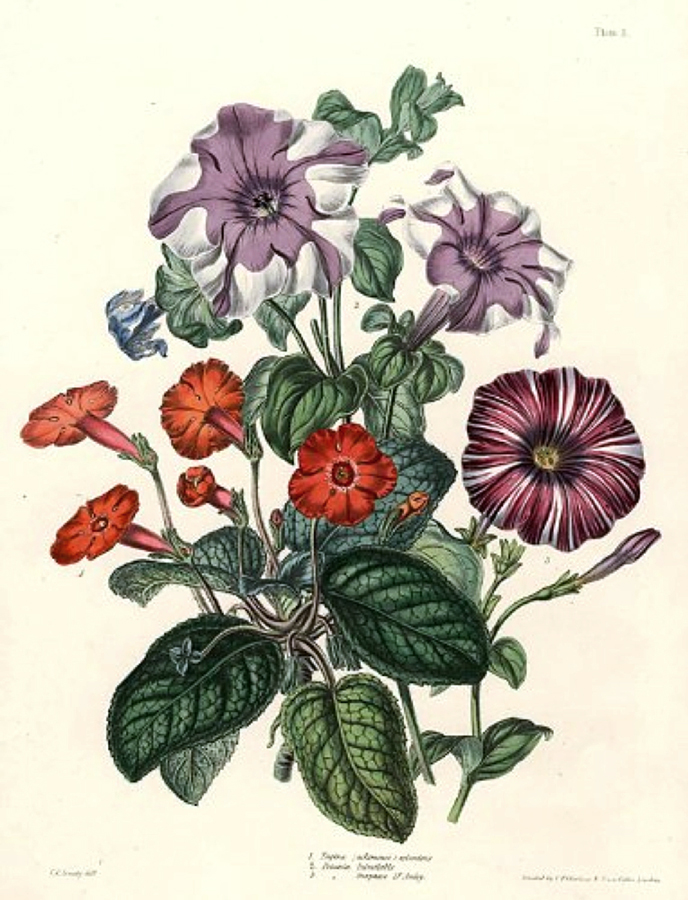
Mixed bouquet of flowers by Charlotte Caroline Sowerby, published as hand-colored zincograph in The Illustrated Bouquet (1857–64). Pictured are varieties of petunia and Achimenes.

== Biography ==
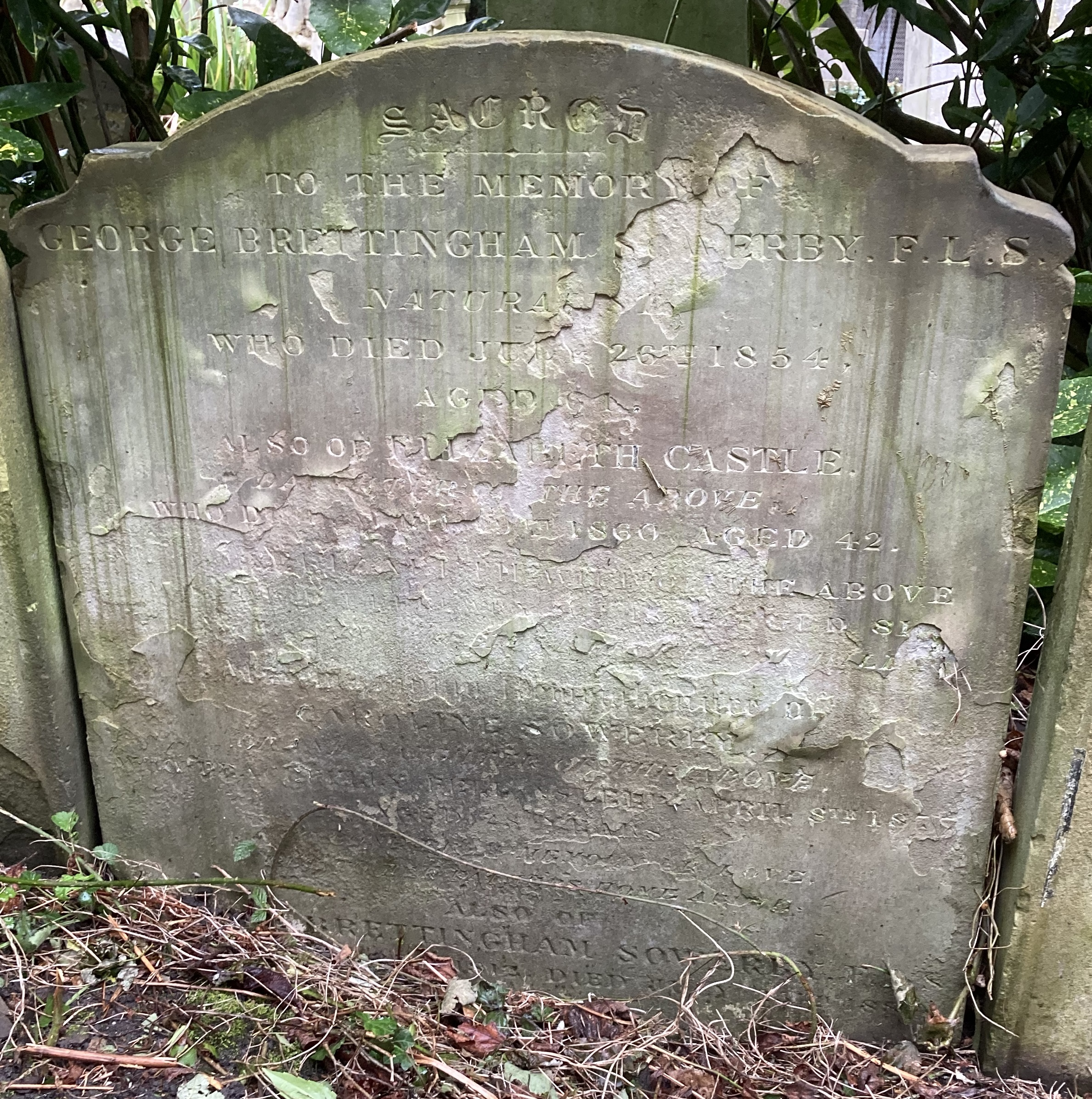
Grave of Charlotte Sowerby in Highgate Cemetery

Charlotte Caroline Sowerby was the oldest daughter of conchologist and illustrator George Brettingham Sowerby I and granddaughter of the naturalist and illustrator James Sowerby. Like her father and grandfather, she became a natural history illustrator. Not much is known of her life, but experts consider her illustrations to be of the highest quality.

Some of her work is included in the now-rare book The Illustrated Bouquet (E.G. Henderson & Son, 1857–1864), which includes images by a number of the best-known botanical artists of the period, including Augusta Innes Withers. Most of the plates in the book are by Sowerby, starting with Plate 10, and range from clematis, dianthus, petunia, and calceolaria to the Australian wildflower Sturt's desert pea (Swainsona formosa, formerly Clianthus dampieri). One illustration of gladiolus takes up a two-page spread.

She also contributed 12 plates to Edward Hamilton's Flora Homeopathica (1852–53).

Although most of Sowerby's known works are botanical illustrations, there is extant an 1854 watercolor by her of a quartz crystal with asbestos inclusions, apparently drawn from a specimen in her family's collection. There are also three drawings of volcanoes made for George Julius Poulett Scrope.

She is buried in a family grave on the west side of Highgate Cemetery with her father George Brettingham Sowerby I and brother George Brettingham Sowerby II.

== Legacy ==
In 1997, a detail of Sowerby's watercolor of Guzmania splendens was included in a British stamp issue.
