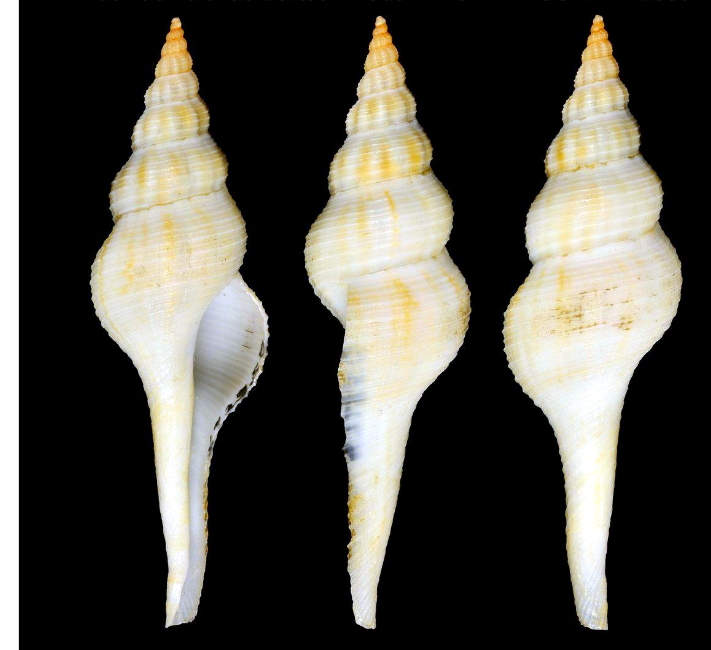
- Shell of Aristofusus helenae (holotype at the Smithsonian Institution)

Scientific classification
- Kingdom: Animalia
- Phylum: Mollusca
- Class: Gastropoda
- Subclass: Caenogastropoda
- Order: Neogastropoda
- Family: Fasciolariidae
- Genus: Aristofusus
- Species: A. helenae

Binomial name
- Aristofusus helenae (Bartsch, 1939)

Synonyms
- Fusinus helenae Bartsch, 1939 (original combination); Heilprinia helenae (Bartsch, 1939)

= Aristofusus helenae =

Species of gastropod

Aristofusus helenae is a species of sea snail, a marine gastropod mollusk in the family Fasciolariidae.

== Distribution ==
- Gulf of Mexico: off Florida
