= John Edward Sowerby =

British painter

John Edward Sowerby (17 January 1825 – 28 January 1870) was a British botanical illustrator and publisher born in Lambeth, London on 17 January 1825. Part of the Sowerby family, he was eldest son of Charles Edward Sowerby and grandson of James Sowerby. John inherited a taste for botanical drawing, and in 1841 produced his first work—the plates for his father's Illustrated Catalogue of British Plants. His life was thenceforth mainly spent in illustrating botanical works, in collaboration with Charles Johnson (1791–1880), and Charles Pierpoint Johnson, who contributed the text. His only independent work was An Illustrated Key to the Natural Orders of British Wild Flowers, published in 1865. He died on 28 January 1870 in London at Lavender Hill, Clapham. He married on 10 February 1853 Elizabeth, youngest daughter of Roger and Ann Dewhurst of Preston, Lancashire. She survived him, and, in recognition of the scientific value of his work, was granted a civil list pension.

== Major works ==
The standard author abbreviation J.E.Sowerby is used to indicate this person as the author when citing a botanical name.

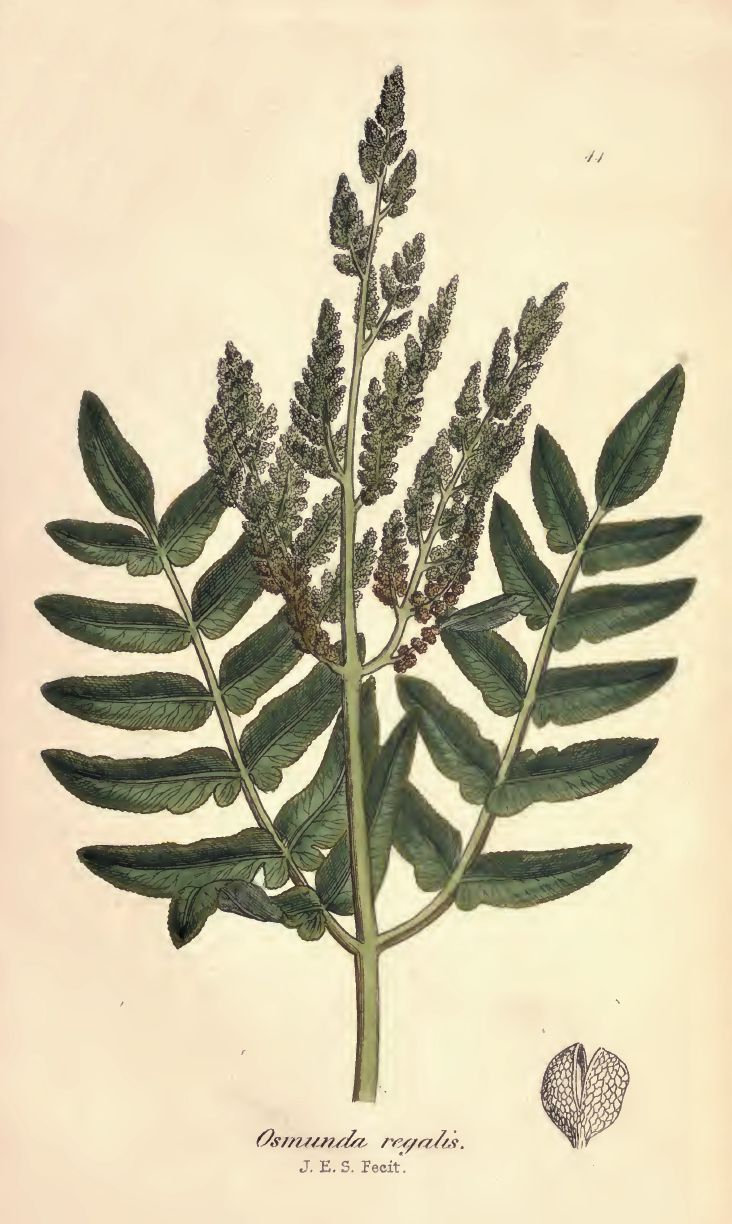
Osmunda regalis, from The Ferns of Great Britain

Sowerby's illustrations appear in the following works

- The Ferns of Great Britain by C. Johnson,’ London, 1855.
- The Fern Allies [a supplement to the preceding]. Descriptions by C. Johnson, London, 1856.
- British Poisonous Plants, by C. Johnson (the twenty-eight plates were copies from ‘English Botany’), London, 1856.
- The Grasses of Great Britain Described by C. Johnson, London, 1857–61.
- Wild Flowers worth Notice, by Mrs. Lankester, 8vo, London, 1861; another edit. 1871.
- British Wild Flowers by C. P. Johnson, London, 1858–60; another edit. in 1863.
- The Useful Plants of Great Britain by C. P. Johnson, London, 1861.
- English Botany, 3rd ed. and supplement, London, 1863–1886.
- Rust, Smut, Mildew, and Mould by M. C. Cooke, London 1865.
