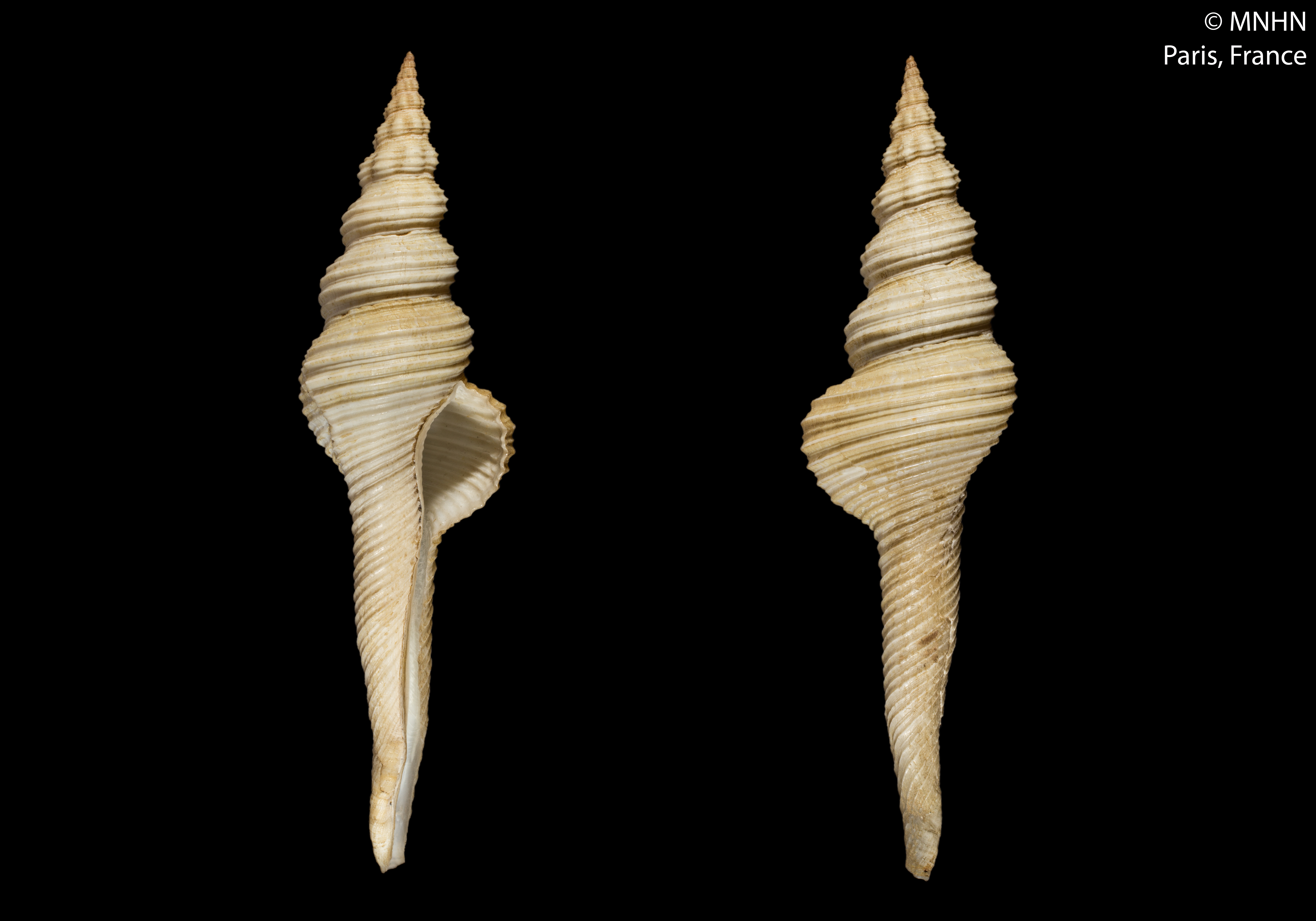
- Shell of Aristofusus couei (specimen in MNHN, Paris)

Scientific classification
- Kingdom: Animalia
- Phylum: Mollusca
- Class: Gastropoda
- Subclass: Caenogastropoda
- Order: Neogastropoda
- Family: Fasciolariidae
- Genus: Aristofusus
- Species: A. couei

Binomial name
- Aristofusus couei (Petit, 1853)

Synonyms
- Fusinus couei (Petit de la Saussaye, 1853); Fusus couei Petit de la Saussaye, 1853; Heilprinia couei (Petit de la Saussaye, 1853)

= Aristofusus couei =

Species of gastropod

Aristofusus couei, common name the Yucatan spindle, is a species of sea snail, a marine gastropod mollusk in the family Fasciolariidae, the spindle snails, the tulip snails and their allies.

== Description ==
The length of the shell attains 104 mm, its diameter 24 mm.

(Original description in French) The shell is fusiform, solid, and relatively heavy, with a white coloration covered by a straw-colored periostracum (epiderme). It is regularly sculptured with spiral grooves (sulcate).

The spire comprises eleven to twelve ventricose (swollen) whorls. The upper whorls are characterized by nodular axial folds (pleats).

The aperture is sub-circular (almost round). The columella is nearly straight and is coated with a white callus. This callus is translucent enough to reveal the internal projections corresponding to the exterior spiral sculpture.

The siphonal canal accounts for approximately half of the shell's total length. It is slightly open (or pervious) along its entire length and is recurved posteriorly (curved backward) at its distal end.

== Distribution ==
This species occurs in the Caribbean Sea off Yucatan, Mexico.
