= Arthur de Carle Sowerby =

British naturalist, explorer, writer and publisher in China

Sowerby (leftmost) in 1908 as part of the Sowerby-Clark expedition

Arthur de Carle Sowerby (8 July 1885 – 16 August 1954; Chinese: 苏柯仁; pinyin: Sū Ke Ren) was a British naturalist, explorer, writer, and publisher in China. His father was Arthur Sowerby (15 October 1857 – 27 June 1934; Chinese: 苏道味; pinyin: Sū Dao Wei). Born in China and having a native proficiency in the local languages he worked on several American and European expeditions into northern China, Mongolia and Manchuria. He founded the first western-style natural history museum in China. He wrote several books and founded the China Journal.

== Life and work ==
In 1918

Arthur Sowerby was born in Tai-yuan Fu, Shansi province, the second child and first son of a Baptist missionary in China, the Reverend Arthur Sowerby, and Louisa Clayton. He was also the great-great-grandson of James Sowerby the botanist and founder of the Geological Society. From 1881, Arthur's parents were based at the Baptist Missionary Society mission station in Shanxi. The Sowerby family was on furlough in England at the time of the 1900 Boxer Rebellion during which many of their friends and colleagues at their Shanxi mission station were massacred.

=== Education ===
Sowerby was taught at home and also went to a school in Chefoo, Shantung, before he was sent to England. He initially went to the Bath Art and Technical School but shifted to study science at Bristol University. He however dropped out and went to work aboard ships and visited Canada and returned to China in 1905 and began to collect specimens for the natural history museum of an Anglo-Chinese college in Tai-yuan Fu (Tianjin). In 1906, he was appointed lecturer at the college and served as curator of its natural history museum.

=== Expeditions ===
Sowerby was invited by Malcom Playfair Anderson to join the Duke of Bedford’s 1906 Mission to collect nearly 15,000 zoological specimens in Shaanxi for the British Museum during which time he discovered a new species of Jerboa which was subsequently named after him: Dipus sagitta sowerby. In 1907 he visited the Ordos Desert in Mongolia. It was with encouragement from Anderson that he trained in taxidermy and illustration.

Map of the 1908-9 expedition

Sowerby was taken on as a naturalist for Robert Sterling Clark's Expedition of 1908-9 which sought specimens for the US National Museum from the Yellow River into Shaanxi and then to Gansu province and made the first map of a little-known area of China. Clarke and Sowerby later published a book about the expedition entitled Through Shên-kan: the account of the Clark expedition in north China, 1908-9. Sowerby married Mary Ann ("May") Mesny in 1909, but she was to die just 5 years later.

He made four separate expeditions into Manchuria and parts of Mongolia during the next few years, the last being in 1915 and then wrote his book Fur and Feather in North China. In the autumn of 1915 he went over to meet his brother and sister, both missionaries in Sian, and took the opportunity to seek more specimens in the Qinling range to the south of the city.

=== Shaanxi Relief ===
During the Xinhai Revolution, Arthur headed up the Shaanxi (Shensi) Relief Expedition. The expedition's task was to rescue and lead to safety as many foreign missionaries as possible. Setting out in December 1911 they trekked to Xi'an where the whole area was in a state of political upheaval following the overthrow of the dynasty. Bandit hordes were rampaging and had taken over much of the countryside. After a number of hair-raising experiences they returned to the safety of Beijing in early 1912.

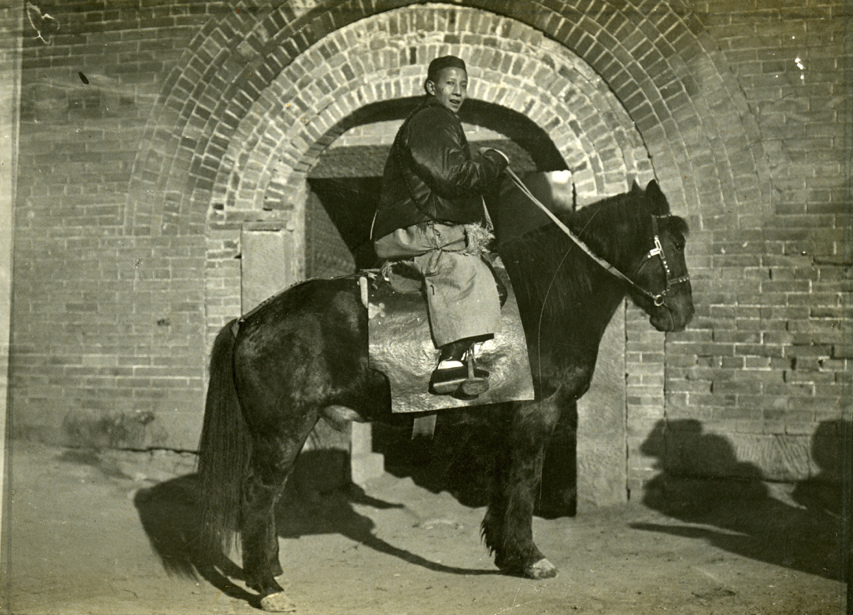
A typical Qli pony, photo by Arthur Sowerby, 1909

=== First World War ===
Sowerby returned to England during the First World War with the intention of joining up, but to his dismay was posted in France to the Chinese Labour Corps (CLC) due to his ability to speak the language. He was demobilised in 1919, remaining in England, spending some time with his brother who had recovered from a gas attack in Passchendaele. He spent the year in England working on his five volume The Naturalist in Manchuria (1922–1930).

=== Shanghai and the China Journal ===
The Shanghai Literary and Scientific Society had been founded in 1857 by missionaries such as E. C. Bridgman, J. Edkins and W. Lockhart. In 1858 it was made the China branch of the Royal Asiatic Society and in 1874 it had a natural history collection established with Shuheng Wang, a taxidermist trained by Armand Davis. Sowerby became a member of the society in 1915 when the museum was headed by him along with C. Noel Davis. By the early part of the 1920s, Sowerby found that his chronic arthritis was preventing him from making any more major expeditions and therefore, when he met and married Clarice Moise in 1922, during her stay in Shanghai on her world tour. Sowerby founded the China Journal which was edited until 1938, with Sowerby making regular contributions and editorials. The Shanghai Museum was moved to a new building in 1933 and Sowerby was involved in the design of the exhibits.

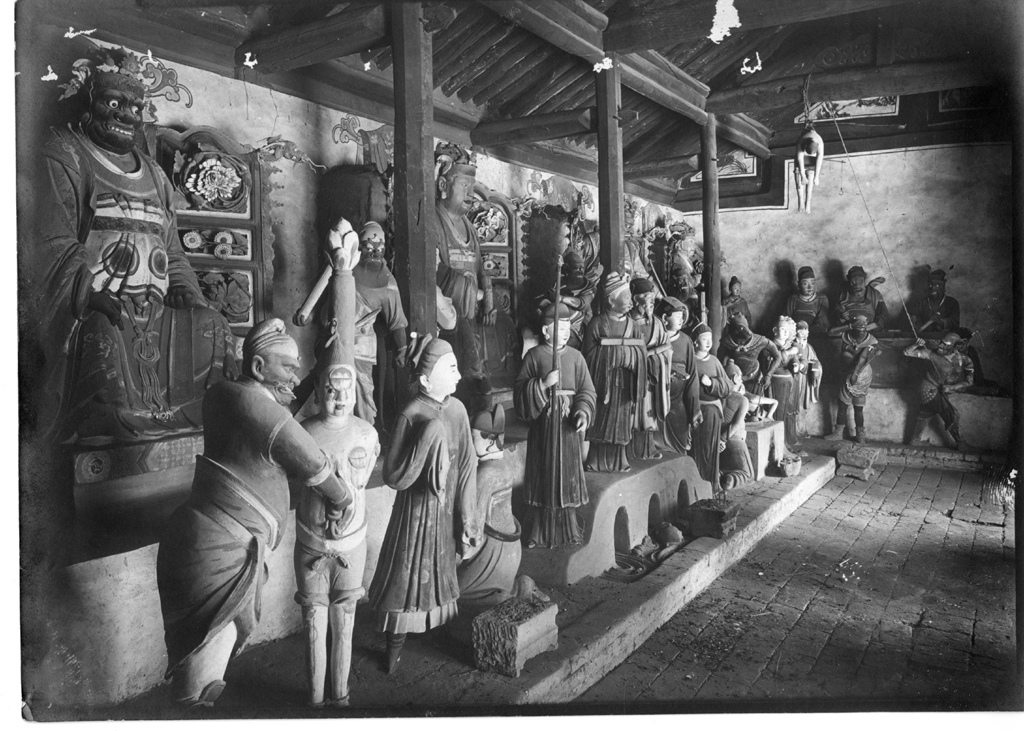
Representation of Buddhist hell in the Longwangmiao at Yan'an, Shaanxi, photo by Arthur Sowerby, n.d.

=== Second World War ===
After the Japanese capture of Shanghai's International Settlement on 8 December 1941, Sowerby, along with thousands of Allied nationals, lived under the Japanese occupation. Early on the morning of 5 November 1942 he was arrested, along with some 350 other prominent or suspicious individuals, by the Japanese kempeitai. However, due to ill health, he was released later that day, while the others began an almost three year internment in the Haiphong Road Camp. In June 1944 the Japanese revoked all previous exemptions from internment due to medical grounds and Sowerby was interned in the Lincoln Avenue Camp at the end of the month. While in camp, he taught botany and zoology to internees.

=== Other interests ===
Sowerby was a Fellow of the Royal Geographical Society, a Fellow of the Zoological Society, a member and President (1935-1940) of the North China Branch of the Royal Asiatic Society and also President (1928) of the China Society of Science and Arts (in Shanghai), as well as being Honorary Director of the Shanghai Museum.

== Personal life and death ==
Sowerby was first married around 1910 to Mary Anne, daughter of John Mesny who was married to a Chinese woman. They had a son Arthur Mesny de Carle Sowerby. No information exists of his first wife subsequently although other family members are mentioned during the Tientsin riots. He married Clarice Sara Moise in 1925 and they lived in Shanghai. They had a son Arthur Mesny de Carle Sowerby. After her death, Sowerby married Alice Muriel Cowens, the nurse of his brother, in 1946. He suffered from sprue. They lived in London for a year before they retired to Washington, D.C. in the United States where Arthur died in 1954.

== Legacy ==
Sowerby was commemorated in the scientific name of a species of Chinese lizard, Lygosaurus sowerbyi, which was described and named by Leonhard Stejneger of the Smithsonian Institution in 1924. As of 2020 the species is considered to be a synonym of Ateuchosaurus chinensis.

== Publications ==
- Nature in Chinese Art, HE Gibson, 1940 – The John Day Company
- Clay Funerary Figurines of the Pre-Han Period in China, 1954 – Hong Kong University Press
- Notes on the Original Habitat of Father David's Deer, 1949 – Université l'Aurore
- A Review of the Mammals of the Japanese Islands, Possessions and Mandated Territories, – Université l'Auroore
- A New Species of Shrew from the Shanghai Area, 1945 – Université l'Aurore
- Amphibians and Reptiles Recorded from Or Known to Occur in the Shanghai Area, M Heude, 1943 – Université l'Aurore
- Birds Recorded from Or Known to Occur in the Shanghai Area, 1943 – Université l'Aurore
- The mammals of the Japanese Islands, a. de Carle Sowerby, 1943 – Universite L'Aurore
- Nature in Chinese art, 1940 – The John Day Company New York
- A naturalist's note-book in China, 1925 – Shanghai: North-China Daily News
- A Naturalist's Holiday by the Sea, 1923 - London: George Routledge & Sons
- On a New Bat from Manchuria, Journal of Mammalogy, 1922
- The Naturalist in Manchuria (in five volumes), 1922 (Volume 1 Volume 2-3)
- Notes on Heude's Bears in the Sikawei Museum, and on the Bears of Palaearctic Eastern Asia, 1920 – Journal of Mammalogy
- Sport and Science on the Mongolian frontier, 1918
- A sportsman's miscellany, 1917
- Fur and feather in North China, 1914
- Through Shên-kan; the account of the Clark expedition in north China, 1908-9, 1912 (co-author)

== See also ==
- Sowerby family
- List of famous big game hunters
