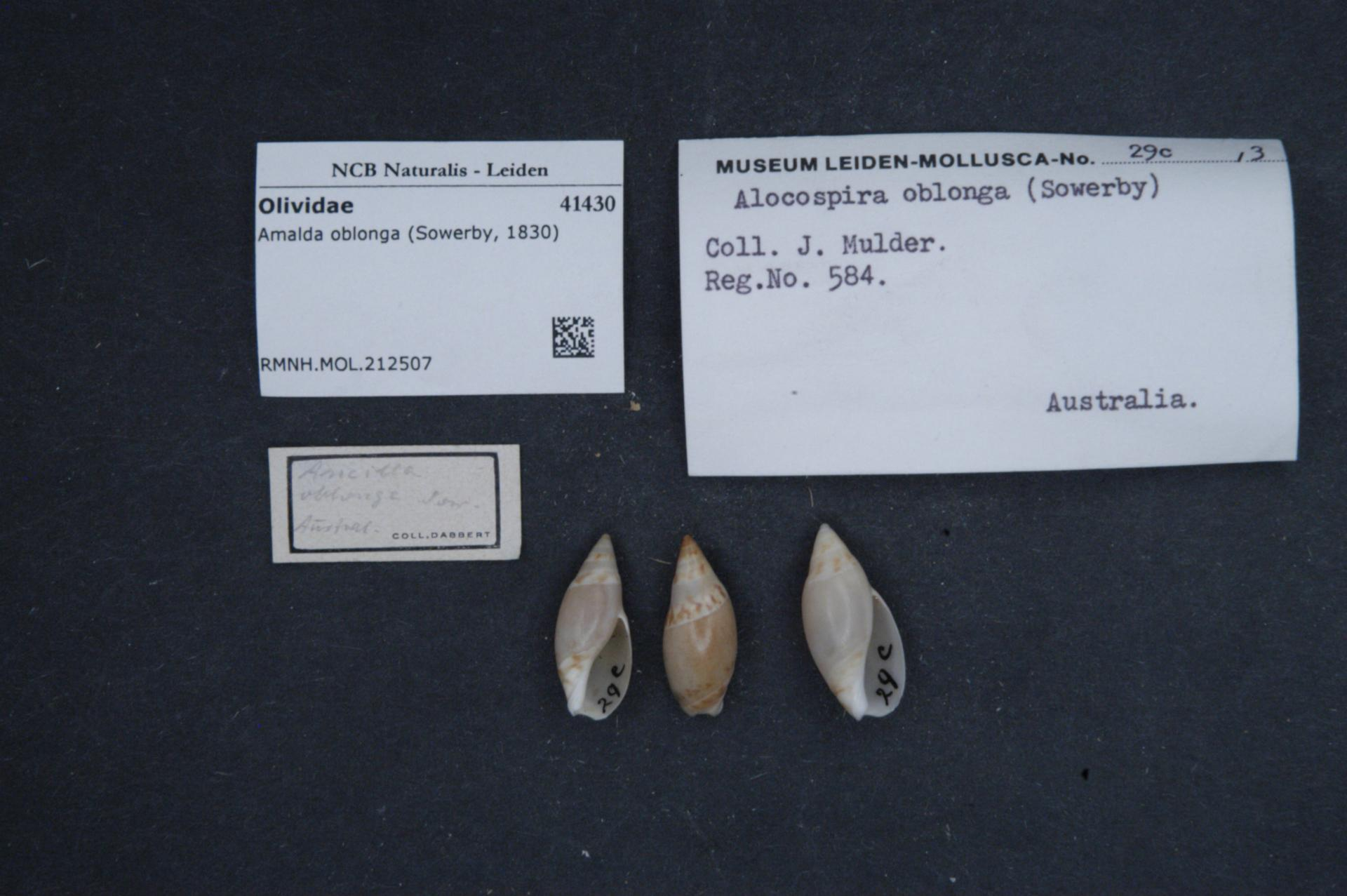

Scientific classification
- Kingdom: Animalia
- Phylum: Mollusca
- Class: Gastropoda
- Subclass: Caenogastropoda
- Order: Neogastropoda
- Family: Ancillariidae
- Genus: Amalda
- Species: A. oblonga

Binomial name
- Amalda oblonga (G.B. Sowerby I, 1830)

= Amalda oblonga =

Species of gastropod

Amalda oblonga is a species of sea snail, a marine gastropod mollusk in the family Ancillariidae.
