= George Brettingham Sowerby I =

British naturalist, illustrator and conchologist

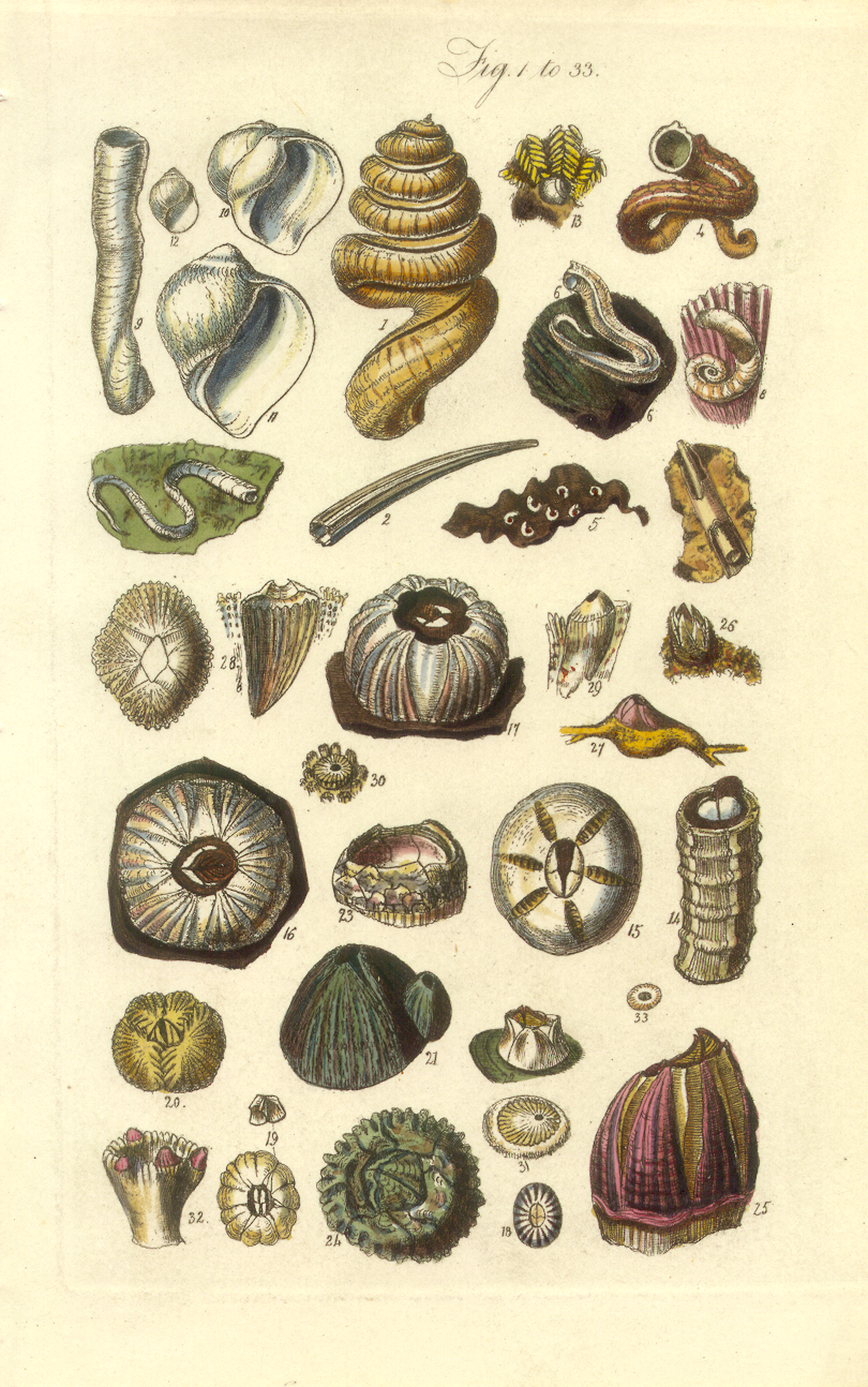
- Born: 12 August 1788
- Died: 26 July 1854 (aged 65)
- Known for: Conchology, malacology
- Scientific career
- Author abbrev. (zoology): Sby., Sowerby

George Brettingham Sowerby I (12 August 1788 – 26 July 1854) was a British naturalist, illustrator and conchologist.

== Life ==
He was the second son of James Sowerby. George was educated at home under private tutors, and afterwards assisted his father in the production of illustrated works on natural history. On the latter's death in 1822, he and his brother James De Carle Sowerby continued their father's work on fossil shells, publishing the latter parts of the Mineral Conchology of Great Britain. He published about 50 papers on molluscs and started several comprehensive, illustrated books on the subject, the most important the Thesaurus Conchyliorum, a work that was continued by his son, George Brettingham Sowerby II and his grandson George Brettingham Sowerby III. One of his first works was the cataloguing of the collection of the Earl of Tankerville. He also dealt in shells and natural history objects, his place of business being first in King Street, Covent Garden, from which he removed to Regent Street, and finally to Great Russell Street.

He was elected a fellow of the Linnean Society on 5 March 1811.

He died at Hanley Road, Hornsey, on 26 July 1854 and is buried on the west side of Highgate Cemetery.

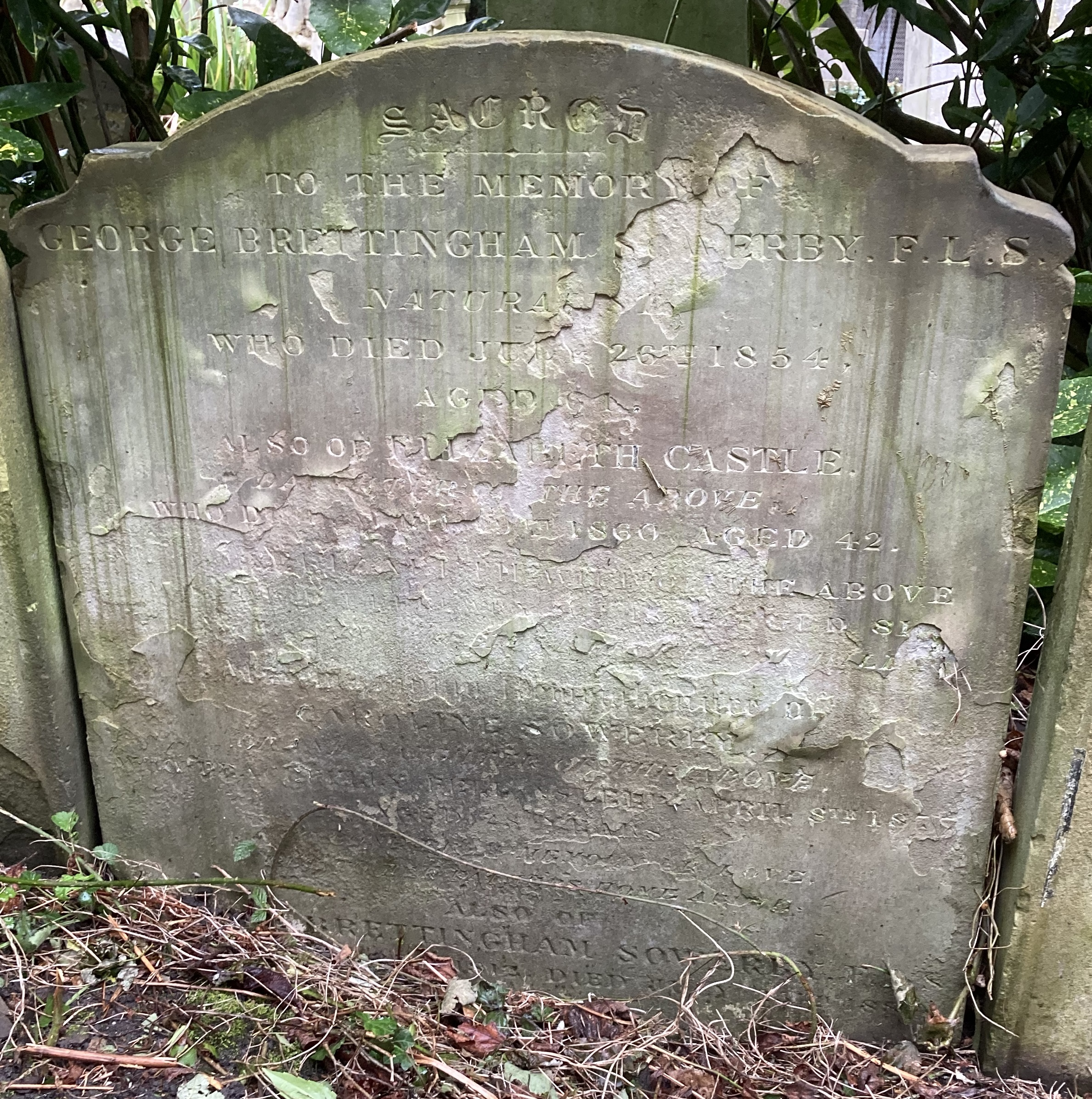
Grave of George Brettingham Sowerby I in Highgate Cemetery

== Family ==
By his wife Elizabeth (second daughter of Nicholas and Mary Meredith), whom he married on 16 April 1811, he had two sons, George Brettingham II and Henry (1825–1891), and a daughter, Charlotte Caroline, who became a botanical illustrator.

George's son Henry was born in Kensington on 28 March 1825. He was educated at Bickerdike's school, Kentish Town, and University College, Gower Street. From 1843 to 1852 he was assistant curator/librarian to the Linnean Society. He went out to Australia in 1854, and became draughtsman at the Melbourne University, and subsequently teacher of drawing in the state schools. During the last twenty years of his life he devoted himself to gold mining. He died near Melbourne on 15 Sept. 1891, having married, in April 1847, Miss Annie Faulkner. He wrote for Reeve's popular handbooks 'Popular Mineralogy,' London, 1850, and illustrated various books such as Flora Homoeopathica of Edward Hamilton which appeared in 1852–53.

== Works ==
Partial list

- A Catalogue of the Shells Contained in the Collection of the Late Earl of Tankerville (1825)
- A Conchological Manual (1839)
- Thesaurus Conchyliorum
- Illustrated Index of British Shells (1859)
- A descriptive catalogue of the species of Leach's genus Margarita. Malacological and Conchological Magazine 1: 23–27 (1838). Henry A. Pilsbry did not think much of this work and said: "His monograph of Margarita in Reeve's Iconica contains more blunders than any work I have ever seen, unless some other papers by the same author prove to be exceptions."

== Determined species by Sowerby I ==
Many species were first described by Sowerby I, for example

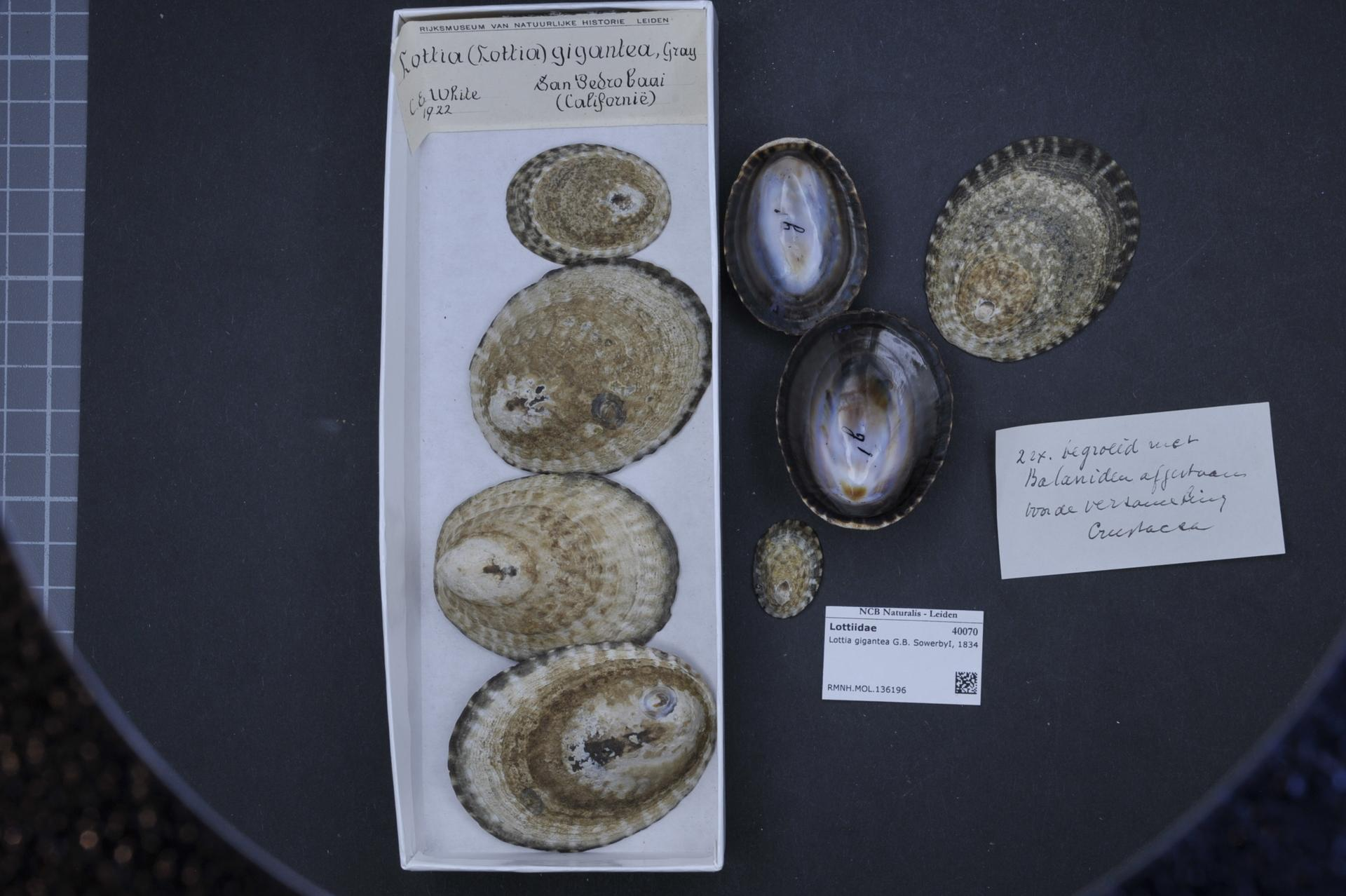
Lottia gigantea G.B. Sowerby I, 1834

- Lottia gigantea
- Diodora calyculata
- Diodora ruepellii

== See also ==
- Sowerby family
