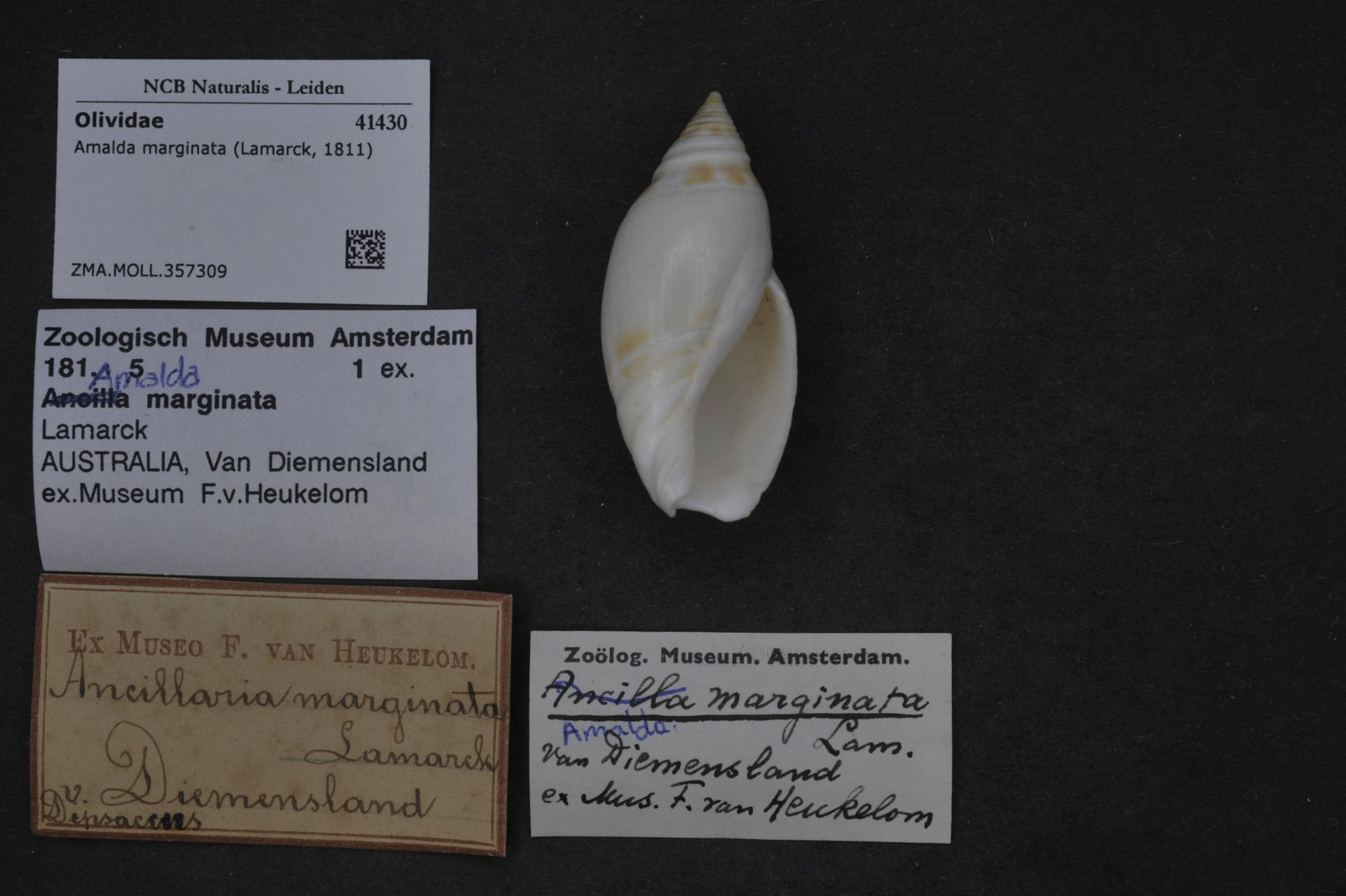

Scientific classification
- Kingdom: Animalia
- Phylum: Mollusca
- Class: Gastropoda
- Subclass: Caenogastropoda
- Order: Neogastropoda
- Family: Ancillariidae
- Genus: Amalda
- Species: A. marginata

Binomial name
- Amalda marginata (Lamarck, 1811)

Synonyms
- Amalda (Alocospira) marginata (Lamarck, 1811); Amalda dyspetes (Iredale, 1929); Ancillaria marginata Lamarck, 1811 (original combination); Ancillaria marginata var. tasmanica Tenison Woods, 1877 junior subjective synonym; Baryspira (Alocospira) dyspetes Iredale, 1929

= Amalda marginata =

Species of gastropod

Amalda marginata is a species of sea snail, a marine gastropod mollusk in the family Ancillariidae.

== Description ==
The length of the shell attains 40 mm, its diameter 19 mm.

(Original description in French) It is an oval, rounded shell with a pointed, transversely keeled spire. It is whitish with a smooth back, but its whorls are decorated near their suture with an interrupted reddish band. The outer lip of its aperture is equipped with a small protruding denticle at the bottom.

(Described as Baryspira (Alocospira) dyspetes) The shell is medium-sized with an open aperture and a slightly swollen shape. The spire is very short and tapered. The shell is primarily white, with a yellow band just behind the suture and a similarly colored anterior canal. The apex consists of two rounded whorls, followed by five nearly smooth adult whorls, with only a faint, central spiral ridge visible. The base of the shell displays about six shallow grooves. The inner lip is covered with a thin glaze that extends beyond the aperture onto the previous whorl.

(Described as Ancillaria marginata var. tasmanica) The shell is ovate-fusiform, solid, with a pyramidal spire shorter than the aperture. It is covered with two spiral keels. The shell is entirely white. The whorls are rounded and bordered above by a white callous band. The front of the body whorl is decorated with such bands in the following order —first with two equidistant spiral grooves, then with a thick, broad, rounded varix, followed by a broad, flattened band, and finally 4-5 spiral folds. The inner lip is somewhat sharp and thin. The outer lip is callous at the back. The aperture is wide, with a broad notch at the base.

== Distribution ==
This marine species is endemic to Australia and occurs off New South Wales, South Australia, Tasmania, Victoria and Western Australia.
