= James Sowerby (1815–1834) =

British mycologist and botanist (1815–1834)

James Sowerby (1815–1834) was a British botanical artist and mycologist, son of James De Carle Sowerby, grandson of James Sowerby. He published the small book The Mushroom and Champignon Illustrated: Compared With, and Distinguished From, the Poisonous Fungi that Resemble Them.
