= George Brettingham Sowerby II =

British naturalist, illustrator, and conchologist

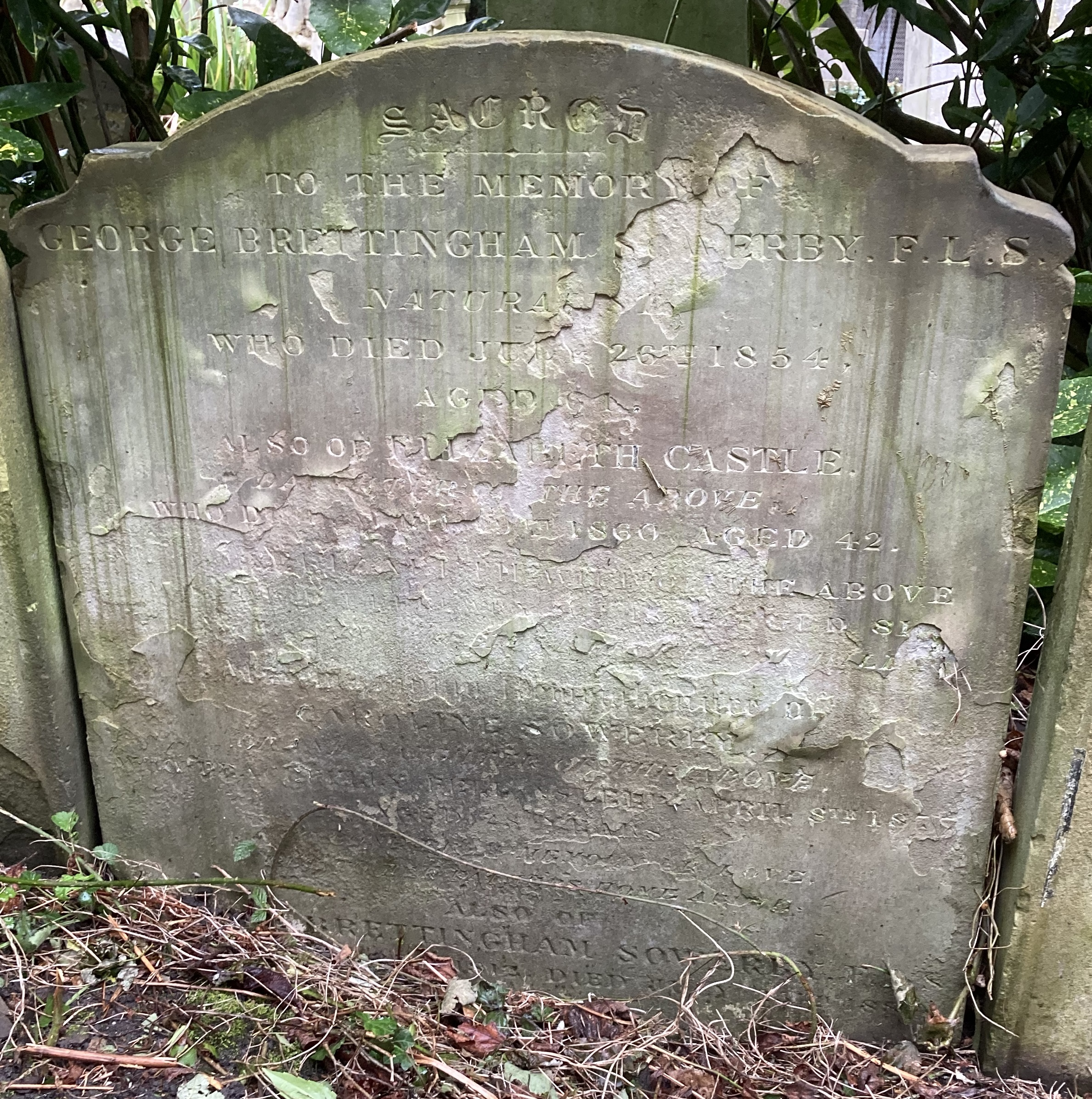
- Grave of George Brettingham Sowerby II in Highgate Cemetery
- Born: 25 March 1812; Lambeth, South London, England
- Died: 26 July 1884 (aged 72); Wood Green, Haringey, England
- Resting place: Highgate Cemetery
- Notable work: Thesaurus Conchyliorum
- Spouse: Margaret Hitchen (m. 1835–1884)
- Father: George Brettingham Sowerby I
- Relatives: George Brettingham Sowerby III (son); Charlotte Caroline Sowerby (sister)
- Scientific career
- Fields: Naturalist, illustrator, and conchologist
- Workplaces: Linnean Society

George Brettingham Sowerby II (25 March 1812 – 26 July 1884) was a British naturalist, illustrator, and conchologist. Together with his father, George Brettingham Sowerby I, he published the Thesaurus Conchyliorum and other illustrated works on molluscs. He was an elected a Fellow of the Linnean Society on 7 May 1844. He was the father of George Brettingham Sowerby III, also a malacologist.

He died on 26 July 1884 and is buried on the west side of Highgate Cemetery with his father George Brettingham Sowerby I and sister Charlotte Caroline Sowerby.

The shell craze was further hyped with the publication of British Conchology, a five volume set of books written by the lawyer John Gwyn Jeffreys (1809–1885) and which managed to combine scientific exactitude with delicate, informative historical commentary. Published between 1862 and 1869, and beautifully illustrated by the conchological artist George Sowerby (1812–1884), British Conchology would not be bettered during the Victorian era and it remains a usable and readable resource to this day.

== See also ==
- Sowerby family
