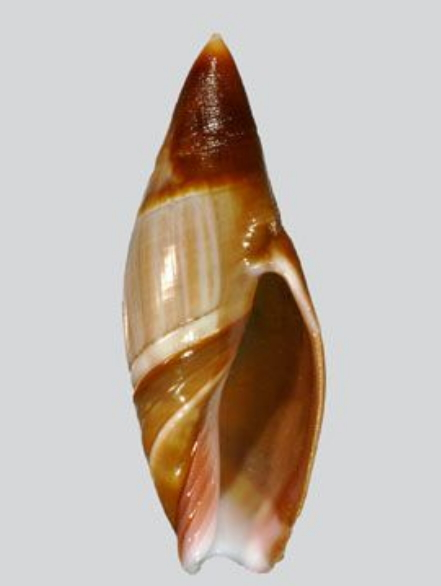
- Shell of Amalda similis (specimen at the Natural History Museum, Rotterdam)

Scientific classification
- Kingdom: Animalia
- Phylum: Mollusca
- Class: Gastropoda
- Subclass: Caenogastropoda
- Order: Neogastropoda
- Family: Ancillariidae
- Genus: Amalda
- Species: A. similis

Binomial name
- Amalda similis (G.B. Sowerby II, 1859)

Synonyms
- Amalda (Baryspira) similis (G. B. Sowerby II, 1859) alternative representation; Ancillaria similis G. B. Sowerby II, 1859 (original combination)

= Amalda similis =

Species of gastropod

Amalda similis is a species of sea snail, a marine gastropod mollusk in the family Ancillariidae.

== Description ==
An albino form is known. Shell size 50-60 mm.

(Original description in Latin) The shell is ovate-oblong and white, with the spire and columella thickened and tinged with brown. The spire is elongated, and the body whorl has a distinct margin, featuring three bands below the lower suture, with the central band sharply raised. The aperture is elongated, angled at the top, with a single tooth below and a notch at the base. The narrow varix is obliquely triplicate.

In Amalda rubiginosa the aperture is very little longer than the spire. In this it occupies two-thirds of the length. The lower part of the body whorl has three belts, the middle one being elevated into a sharp ridge at the back. The shape of the aperture is different, being angulated above.

An operculated species.

== Distribution ==
This marine species occurs off Mozambique, trawled at 35-50 metres.
