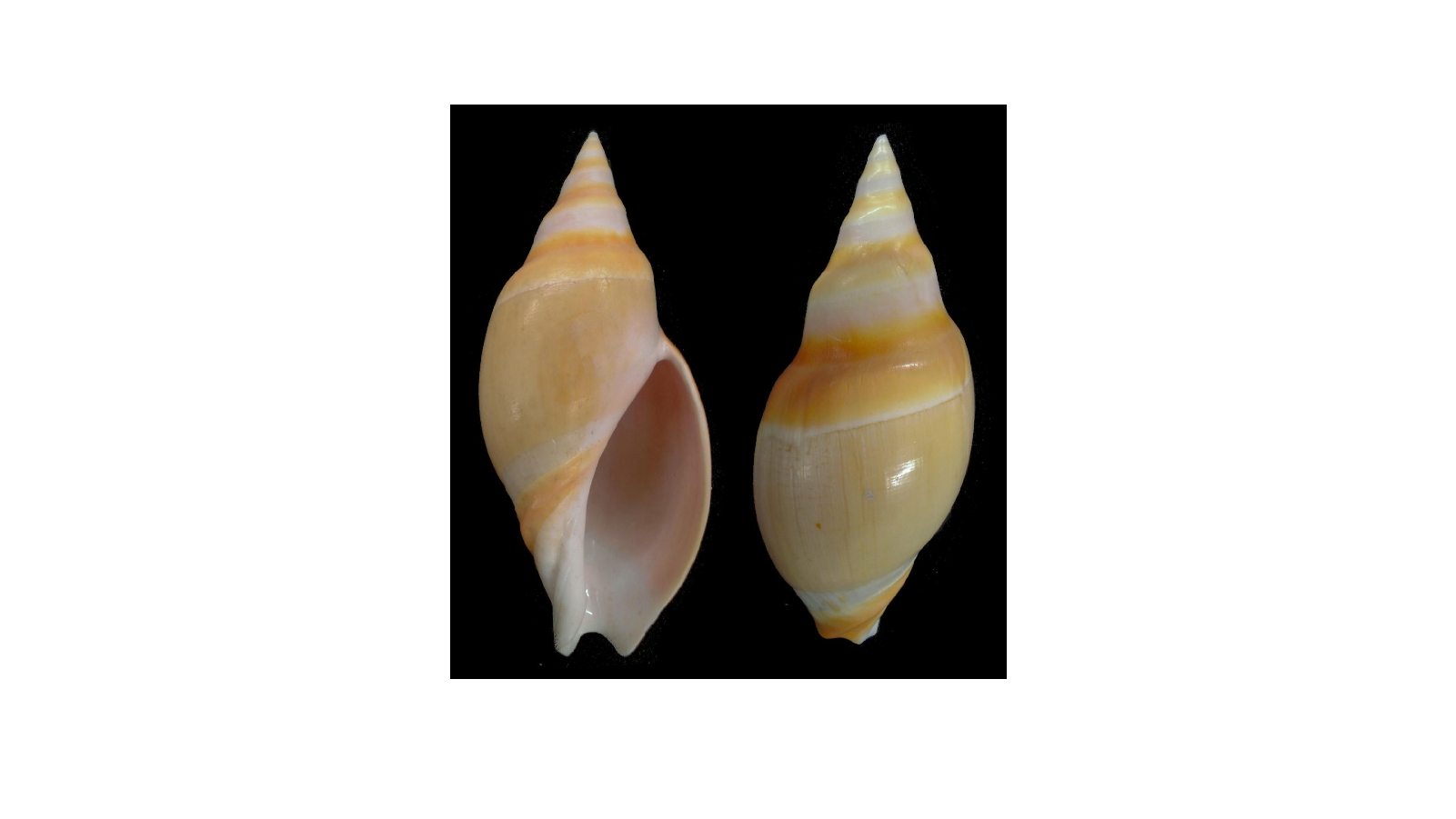
- Shell of Amalda vernedei (lectotype at the Natural History Museum, London)

Scientific classification
- Kingdom: Animalia
- Phylum: Mollusca
- Class: Gastropoda
- Subclass: Caenogastropoda
- Order: Neogastropoda
- Family: Ancillariidae
- Genus: Amalda
- Species: A. vernedei

Binomial name
- Amalda vernedei (G.B. Sowerby II, 1859)

Synonyms
- Ancillaria vernedei G. B. Sowerby II, 1859 (original combination)

= Amalda vernedei =

Species of gastropod

Amalda vernedei is a species of sea snail, a marine gastropod mollusk in the family Ancillariidae.

== Description ==
The length of the shell attains 87 mm.

(Original description in Latin) The fusiform shell is swollen and has an orange-tawny color. The spire is elongated, acuminate and gradated. The whorls are bordered with a callous orange band, with a white band below the lower sulcus; with two lower bands, one orange, folded in the middle, the other white. The aperture is wide, pinkish above, white below, with no denticle and is emarginate. The columellar varix is obliquely triangular, truncated at the base and with a single groove at the top.

This Queen of Ancillariidae is nearly twice as long as any other species. The nearest resemblance in form and structure is Amalda rubiginosa, which, although a large Amalda, is small, compared to these giants. Amalda vernedei is much lighter. It is of an orange-yellow colour, instead of brown It has no columellar callus, and is not thickened at the spire Its varix is thin, and comparatively smooth and flat.

== Distribution ==
This marine species occurs off the Philippines, China, Indonesia and Australia.
