= Turrancilla williamsoni =

Scientific classification
- Kingdom: Animalia
- Phylum: Mollusca
- Class: Gastropoda
- Subclass: Caenogastropoda
- Order: Neogastropoda
- Family: Ancillariidae
- Genus: Turrancilla
- Species: T. williamsoni

Binomial name
- Turrancilla williamsoni Petuch, 1987

Species of gastropod

Turrancilla williamsoni is a species of sea snail, a marine gastropod mollusk in the family Ancillariidae.

== Description ==
Original description: "Shell very slender and elongated, shiny and polished, with an elongated, protracted spire; fascicular band very small, restricted to anterior tip of shell; suture distinctly keeled; shell pale yellow-orange with darker orange enamel along shoulder and on spire whorls; fasciole darker orange; protoconch large, rounded, dome-like; interior of aperture pale orange; columella with 1 large twisted plication; operculum unknown."

== Distribution ==
Locus typicus: "Off Punto Fijo, Gulf of Venezuela, Venezuela."
