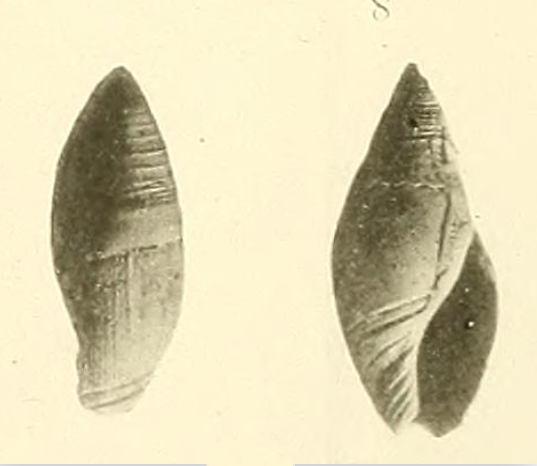
- Shell of Alocospira papillata

Scientific classification
- Kingdom: Animalia
- Phylum: Mollusca
- Class: Gastropoda
- Subclass: Caenogastropoda
- Order: Neogastropoda
- Family: Ancillariidae
- Genus: Alocospira
- Species: †A. papillata

Binomial name
- †Alocospira papillata (Tate, 1889)

Synonyms
- † Ancillaria papillata Tate, 1889

= Alocospira papillata =

Species of gastropod

Alocospira papillata is an extinct species of sea snail, a marine gastropod mollusk in the family Ancillariidae, the olives.

== Description ==
The length of the shell attains 25 mm, its diameter 9.25 mm. (Original description) This is a solid, cylindrically oblong shell. Its spire is shaped like a pyramid, tapering to a sharp point, and ends in a small, blunt pullus (the very tip of the spire) that sticks out.

The callus on the spire is smooth, shiny, and microscopically granular. It is decorated with narrow, sharply rounded spiral ridges of different sizes, with two or three smaller ridges often found between the larger ones. The aperture (the opening) makes up a little more than half of the shell's total length.

== Distribution ==
Fossils of this marine species were found in Tertiary strata on Victoria, Australia.
