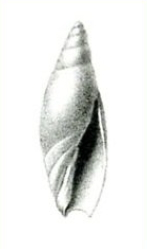
- Shell of Ancillista hasta (holotype)

Scientific classification
- Kingdom: Animalia
- Phylum: Mollusca
- Class: Gastropoda
- Subclass: Caenogastropoda
- Order: Neogastropoda
- Family: Ancillariidae
- Genus: Ancillista
- Species: A. hasta

Binomial name
- Ancillista hasta (von Martens, 1902)

Synonyms
- Ancillaria hasta E. von Martens, 1902 (original combination)

= Ancillista hasta =

Species of gastropod

Ancillista hasta is a species of sea snail, a marine gastropod mollusk in the family Ancillariidae.

== Description ==
The length of the shell attains 30 mm, its diameter 11 mm

(Original description in Latin) The shell is elongated and lance-shaped. It is imperforate (lacking an umbilical opening), smooth, and shiny, with a pale rosy-tawny color that turns white toward the apex. It has 7 rather flat whorls that grow regularly, with the sutures being coated over. The body whorl is moderately narrow and slightly convex. At its base, it is sculpted with three prominent spiral lines that enclose two impressed zones; below these lines, it is white. The aperture occupies 2/3 of the total length and is lance-shaped. The outer lip is slightly wavy and white, while the very bottom of the columellar margin is vertical and thickened.

== Distribution ==
This marine species was found on the Agulhas Bank, South Africa.
