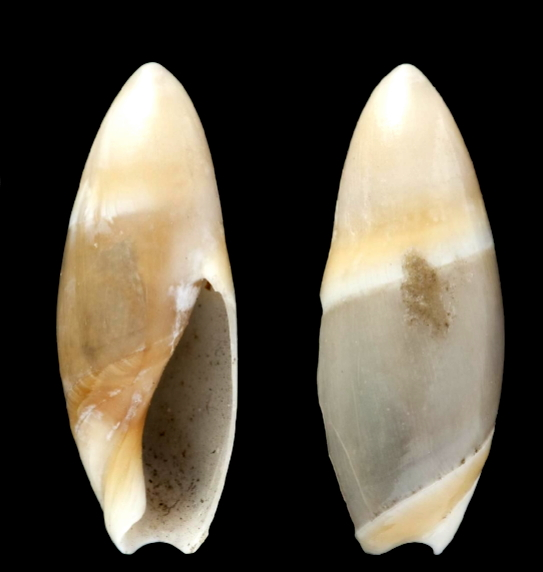
- Shell of Amalda angustata (specimen at the Natural History Museum, Rotterdam)

Scientific classification
- Kingdom: Animalia
- Phylum: Mollusca
- Class: Gastropoda
- Subclass: Caenogastropoda
- Order: Neogastropoda
- Family: Ancillariidae
- Genus: Amalda
- Species: A. angustata

Binomial name
- Amalda angustata (G.B. Sowerby II, 1859)

Synonyms
- Amalda errorum Tomlin, 1921; Ancilla errorum Tomlin, 1921 (junior synonym); † Ancilla miserula Yokoyama, 1928 junior subjective synonym; Ancillaria angustata G. B. Sowerby II, 1859 (original combination)

= Amalda angustata =

Species of gastropod

Amalda angustata is a species of sea snail, a marine gastropod mollusk in the family Ancillariidae.

== Description ==
The length of the shell varies between 12 mm and 17 mm; its diameter 5.4 mm.

The shell is elongated and fusiform, with a slender, tapering shape. It has a high, pointed spire, typically smooth and glossy, with well-defined whorls. The overall appearance of the shell is sleek and streamlined. The body whorl is the largest and forms the majority of the shell's length. It is adorned with fine spiral striations, often subtle, giving the shell a polished look.

The aperture is narrow and elongated, occupying a significant portion of the shell's height. The outer lip is thin and smooth, curving gently at the base. The siphonal canal is relatively short and open, while the inner lip is coated with a thin callus, extending slightly onto the body whorl.

The shell tends to be pale, often a greyish or creamy white, sometimes with faint bands or markings that enhance its delicate appearance. The overall texture is smooth, with a glossy finish that reflects light subtly.

This species is often associated with sandy environments, where its streamlined shape allows it to burrow easily.

== Distribution ==
This marine species occurs off South Africa.
