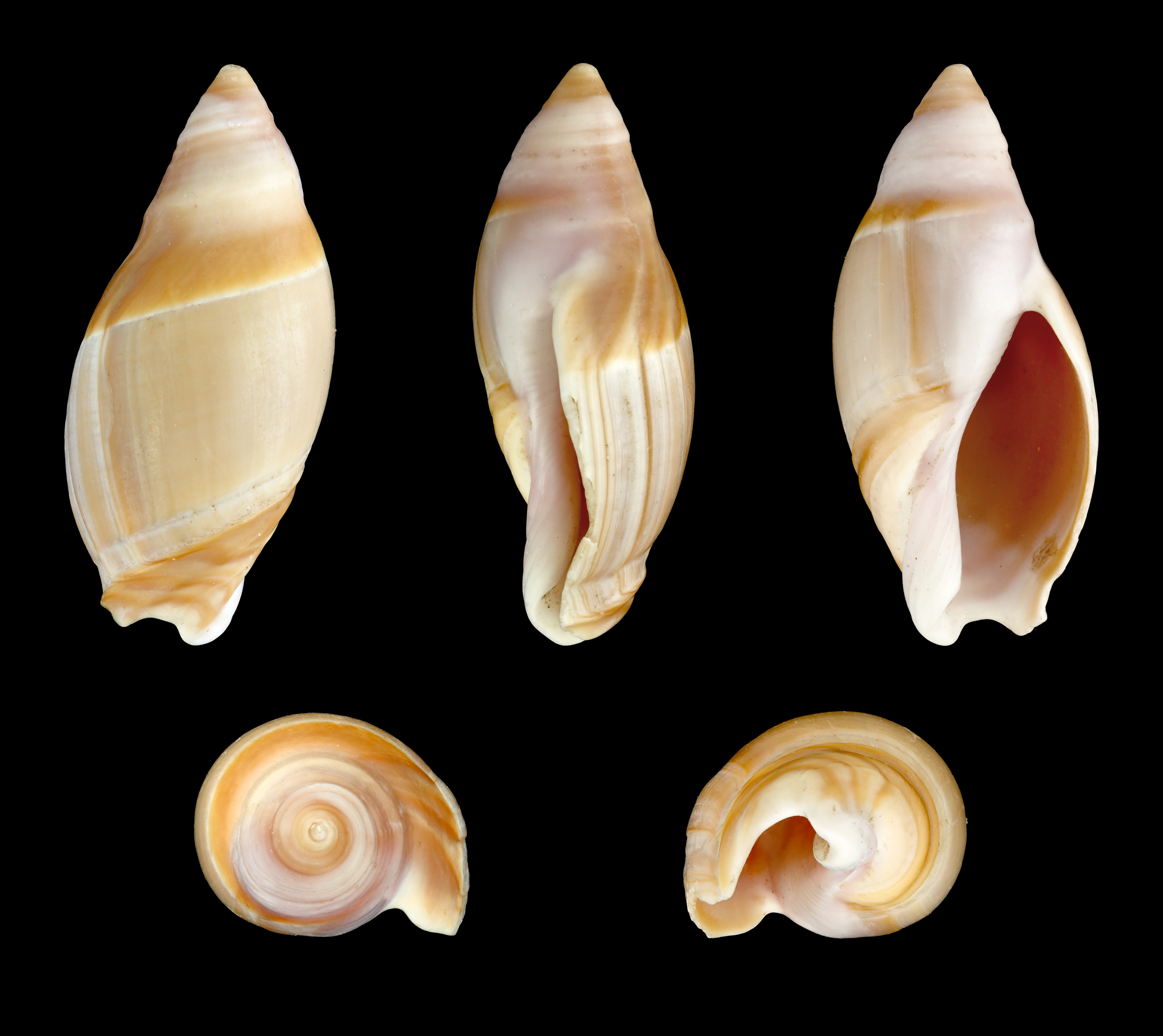
- Five views of a shell of Amalda mamillata

Scientific classification
- Kingdom: Animalia
- Phylum: Mollusca
- Class: Gastropoda
- Subclass: Caenogastropoda
- Order: Neogastropoda
- Family: Ancillariidae
- Genus: Amalda
- Species: A. mamillata

Binomial name
- Amalda mamillata (Hinds, 1844)

Synonyms
- Amalda (Alocospira) mamillata (Hinds, 1844); Ancilla mammilla G. B. Sowerby I, 1844 of authors; Ancillaria mamillata Hinds, 1844 (original combination)

= Amalda mamillata =

Species of gastropod

Amalda mamillata, common name the mammillate ancilla, is a species of sea snail, a marine gastropod mollusc in the family Ancillariidae.

== Description ==
The length of the shell varies between 30 mm and 60 mm.

(Original description in Latin) The shell is elongated-ovate. It is orange-tawny in color. The body whorl is banded more intensely at the top and base. The spire is very mammillate, grooved, as if lathe-turned, with a pointed apex, and is prominently covered with a rough callus at the front and on the right side. The lower part of the outer lip is toothed, and the columella is thickened with a white callus.

== Distribution ==
This marine species occurs off Taiwan and in the South China Sea
