= Turrancilla apicalis =

Scientific classification
- Kingdom: Animalia
- Phylum: Mollusca
- Class: Gastropoda
- Subclass: Caenogastropoda
- Order: Neogastropoda
- Family: Ancillariidae
- Genus: Turrancilla
- Species: T. apicalis

Binomial name
- Turrancilla apicalis (Ninomiya, 1988)

Synonyms
- Ancillus apicalis Ninomiya, 1988

Species of gastropod

Turrancilla apicalis is a species of sea snail, a marine gastropod mollusk in the family Ancillariidae.
