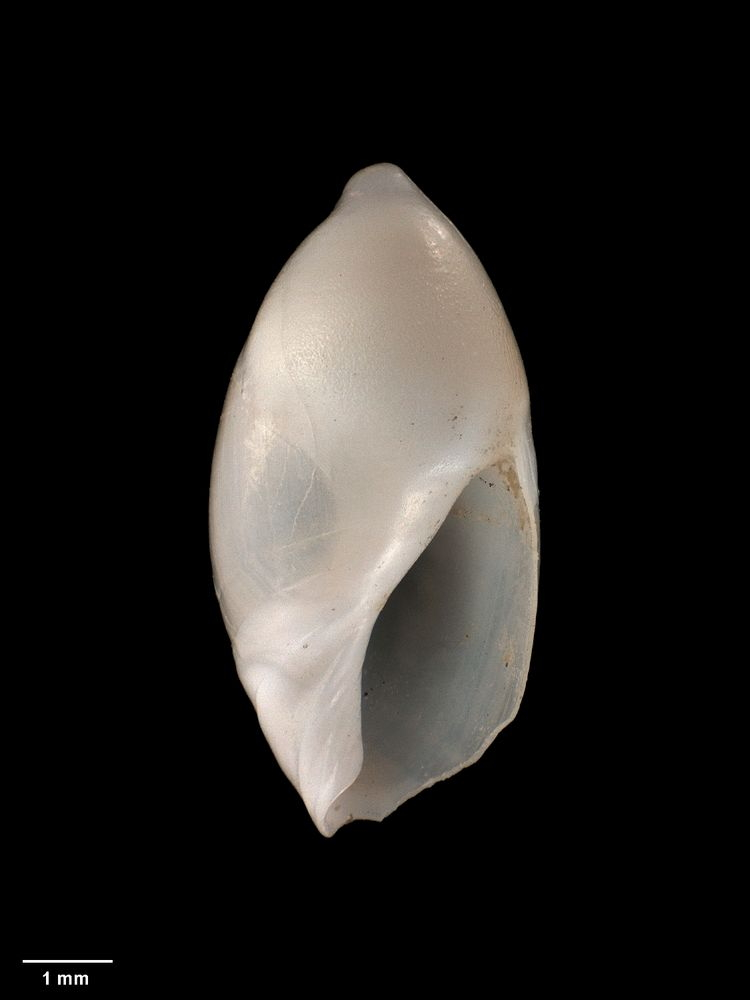
- Shell of Amalda benthicola (holotype at the Museum of New Zealand]

Scientific classification
- Kingdom: Animalia
- Phylum: Mollusca
- Class: Gastropoda
- Subclass: Caenogastropoda
- Order: Neogastropoda
- Family: Ancillariidae
- Genus: Amalda
- Species: A. benthicola

Binomial name
- Amalda benthicola Dell, 1956

= Amalda benthicola =

Species of gastropod

Amalda benthicola is a species of sea snail, a marine gastropod mollusk in the family Ancillariidae.

== Description ==
Amalda benthicola is a small mollusk, its height reaching 22 mm. They were first discovered by R. K. Dell in 1956.

== Distribution ==
This marine species is endemic to New Zealand and occurs off southern South Island, Auckland and the Chatham Islands, at depths between 350 m and 600 m.
