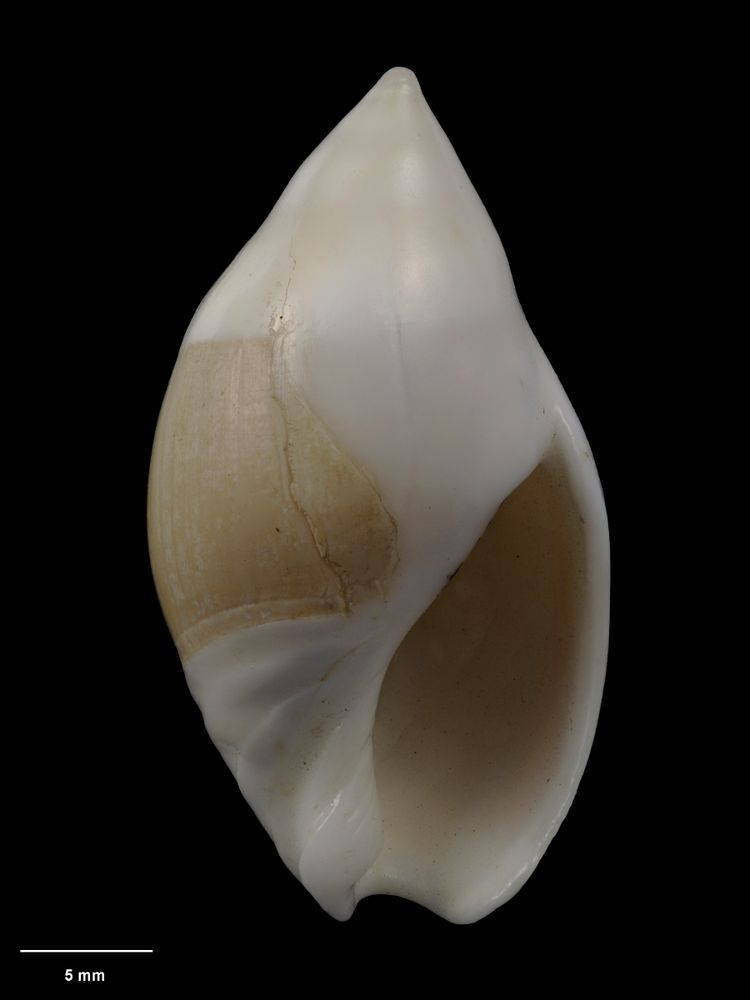
- Shell of Amalda bathamae (holotype at the Museum of New Zealand)

Scientific classification
- Kingdom: Animalia
- Phylum: Mollusca
- Class: Gastropoda
- Subclass: Caenogastropoda
- Order: Neogastropoda
- Family: Ancillariidae
- Genus: Amalda
- Species: A. bathamae

Binomial name
- Amalda bathamae (Dell, 1956)

Synonyms
- Amalda (Baryspira) bathamae (Dell, 1956) alternative representation; Baryspira bathamae Dell, 1956; Baryspira bathami Dell, 1956

= Amalda bathamae =

Species of gastropod

Amalda bathamae is a species of small deepwater sea snail, a marine gastropod mollusc in the family Ancillariidae.

== Taxonomy ==
Status unbcertain.

== Description ==
The length of the shell attains 37 mm, its diameter 19 mm.

== Distribution ==
This marine species is endemic to New Zealand and occurs off eastern Otago, South Island, and off Bounty Islands
