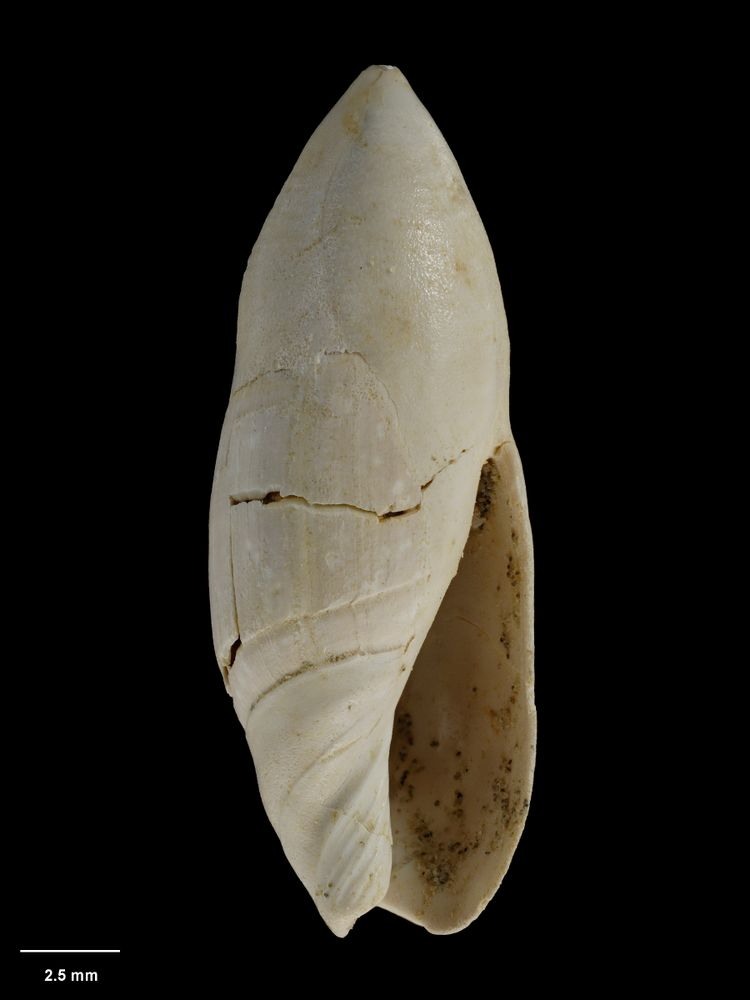
- Shell of Alocospira electa (specimen at the Museum of New Zealand)

Scientific classification
- Kingdom: Animalia
- Phylum: Mollusca
- Class: Gastropoda
- Subclass: Caenogastropoda
- Order: Neogastropoda
- Family: Ancillariidae
- Genus: Alocospira
- Species: †A. electa

Binomial name
- †Alocospira electa (Marwick, 1929)

Synonyms
- † Baryspira electa Marwick, 1929 (superseded combination)

= Alocospira electa =

Species of gastropod

Alocospira electa is an extinct species of sea snail, a marine gastropod mollusk in the family Ancillariidae, the olives.

== Description ==
The length of the shell attains 22 mm, its diameter 8 mm. (Original description) This somewhat small, subcylindrical shell has a spire and aperture of roughly equal height. The callus on the spire has weak spiral patterns. On the inner lip, the callus extends to the spire's apex, with its outer margin forming a gentle S-curve. The lower columella features six similar spiral folds, the topmost of which is slightly more pronounced, with a faint thread in the interspaces.

== Distribution ==
Fossils of this marine species were found on Southland, New Zealand.
