= Turrancilla monachalis =

Scientific classification
- Kingdom: Animalia
- Phylum: Mollusca
- Class: Gastropoda
- Subclass: Caenogastropoda
- Order: Neogastropoda
- Family: Ancillariidae
- Genus: Turrancilla
- Species: T. monachalis

Binomial name
- Turrancilla monachalis (Ninomiya, 1988)

Synonyms
- Ancillus monachalis Ninomiya, 1988 (original combination); Ancillus monachilus [sic] (misspelling)

Species of gastropod

Turrancilla monachalis is a species of sea snail, a marine gastropod mollusk in the family Ancillariidae.

== Description ==
Shell size 28 mm.

== Distribution ==
Trawled off Taiwan.
