= Ancillina lindae =

Scientific classification
- Kingdom: Animalia
- Phylum: Mollusca
- Class: Gastropoda
- Subclass: Caenogastropoda
- Order: Neogastropoda
- Family: Ancillariidae
- Genus: Ancillina
- Species: A. lindae

Binomial name
- Ancillina lindae (Petuch, 1987)

Synonyms
- Gracilancilla lindae Petuch, 1987

Species of gastropod

Gracilancilla lindae is a species of sea snail, a marine gastropod mollusk in the family Ancillariidae.

== Description ==
Original description: "Shell very thin and fragile, very elongated with extremely protracted spire; shell without shoulder, fusiform; aperture elongated, narrow; anterior one-fourth of shell with separate enameled area; protoconch extremely large in proportion to shell size, rounded, dome-like; color pale cream-white, highly polished; columella with 2 plications; interior of aperture pale cream-white."

== Distribution ==
Locus typicus: "Off Punto Fijo, Paraguana Peninsula,
Gulf of Venezuela, Venezuela."
