= Ancillista depontesi =

Scientific classification
- Kingdom: Animalia
- Phylum: Mollusca
- Class: Gastropoda
- Subclass: Caenogastropoda
- Order: Neogastropoda
- Family: Ancillariidae
- Genus: Ancillista
- Species: A. depontesi

Binomial name
- Ancillista depontesi Kilburn, 1998

Species of gastropod

Ancillista depontesi is a species of sea snail, a marine gastropod mollusk in the family Ancillariidae.

== Distribution ==
This marine species occurs in Algoa Bay, South Africa.
