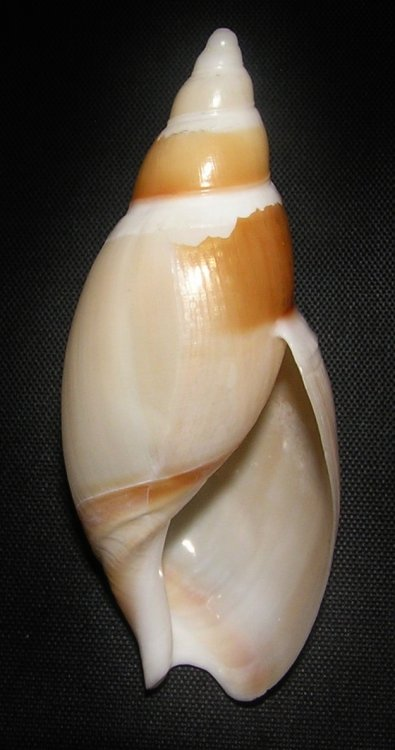
- Shell of Ancillista velesiana

Scientific classification
- Kingdom: Animalia
- Phylum: Mollusca
- Class: Gastropoda
- Subclass: Caenogastropoda
- Order: Neogastropoda
- Family: Ancillariidae
- Genus: Ancillista
- Species: A. velesiana

Binomial name
- Ancillista velesiana Iredale, 1936

Synonyms
- Ancilla velesiana (Iredale, 1936)

= Ancillista velesiana =

Species of gastropod

Ancillista velesiana is a species of sea snail, a marine gastropod mollusk in the family Ancillariidae.

== Description ==
This species is characterized by the narrow, smooth, barely twisted columella, the relatively large, blunt protoconch, the thin, finely striate shell, shallow siphonal notch and sutures that are relatively free of secondary callus. ]

== Distribution ==
The genus Ancillista velesiana Iredale, 1936), is endemic to Australia and occurs off New South Wales and Queensland.
