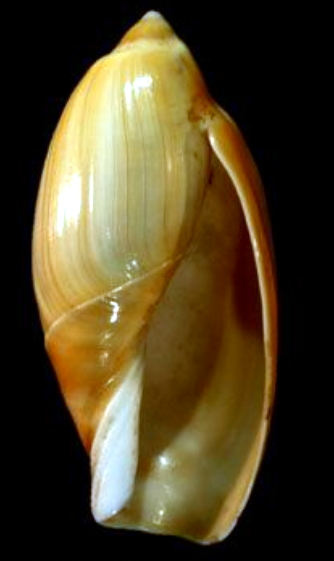
- Shell of Anolacia bozzettii (specimen at the Natural History Museum, Rotterdam)

Scientific classification
- Kingdom: Animalia
- Phylum: Mollusca
- Class: Gastropoda
- Subclass: Caenogastropoda
- Order: Neogastropoda
- Family: Ancillariidae
- Genus: Anolacia
- Species: A. bozzettii

Binomial name
- Anolacia bozzettii Prati, 1995

= Anolacia bozzettii =

Species of gastropod

Anolacia bozzettii is a species of sea snail, a marine gastropod mollusk in the family Ancillariidae.

== Description ==
The length of the shell attains 40 mm.

== Distribution ==
This marine species occurs off Kenya.
