= Ancillina sumatrana =

Scientific classification
- Kingdom: Animalia
- Phylum: Mollusca
- Class: Gastropoda
- Subclass: Caenogastropoda
- Order: Neogastropoda
- Family: Ancillariidae
- Genus: Ancillina
- Species: A. sumatrana

Binomial name
- Ancillina sumatrana (Thiele, 1925)

Synonyms
- Ancilla sumatrana Thiele, 1925 (basionym); Gracilancilla sumatrana (Thiele, 1925)

Species of gastropod

Ancillina sumatrana is a species of sea snail, a marine gastropod mollusk in the family Ancillariidae.
