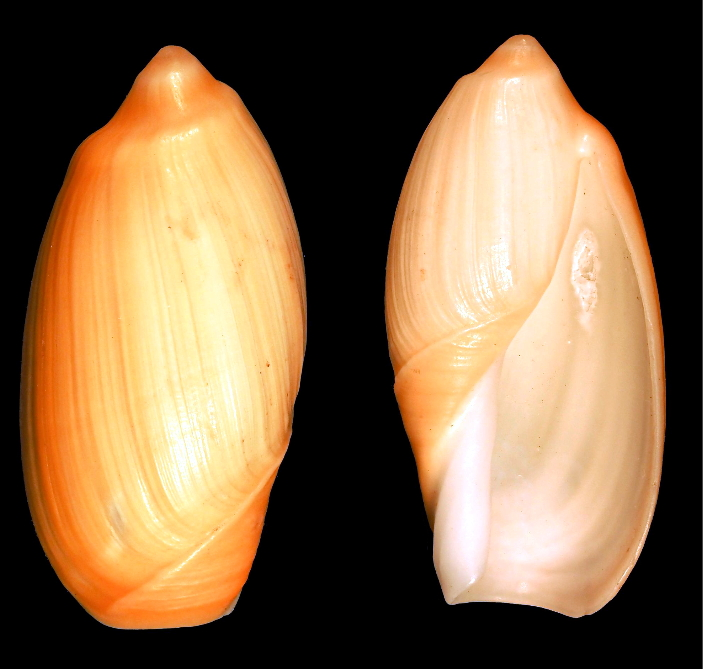
- Shell of Anolacia lorenzi (holotype at MNHN, Paris)

Scientific classification
- Kingdom: Animalia
- Phylum: Mollusca
- Class: Gastropoda
- Subclass: Caenogastropoda
- Order: Neogastropoda
- Family: Ancillariidae
- Genus: Anolacia
- Species: A. lorenzi

Binomial name
- Anolacia lorenzi T. Cossignani, 2022

= Anolacia lorenzi =

Species of gastropod

Anolacia lorenzi is a species of sea snail, a marine gastropod mollusk in the family Ancillariidae.

== Distribution ==
This marine species occurs off the coast of Tanzania.
