= Ancillina apicalis =

Scientific classification
- Kingdom: Animalia
- Phylum: Mollusca
- Class: Gastropoda
- Subclass: Caenogastropoda
- Order: Neogastropoda
- Family: Ancillariidae
- Genus: Ancillina
- Species: A. apicalis

Binomial name
- Ancillina apicalis (Kay, 1979)

Synonyms
- Olivella apicalis Kay, 1979 (original combination)

Species of gastropod

Ancillina apicalis is a species of small sea snail, marine gastropod mollusk in the family Ancillariidae.

== Description ==
The length of the shell varies between 6 mm and 8 mm.

== Distribution ==
This marine species occurs off Hawaii.
