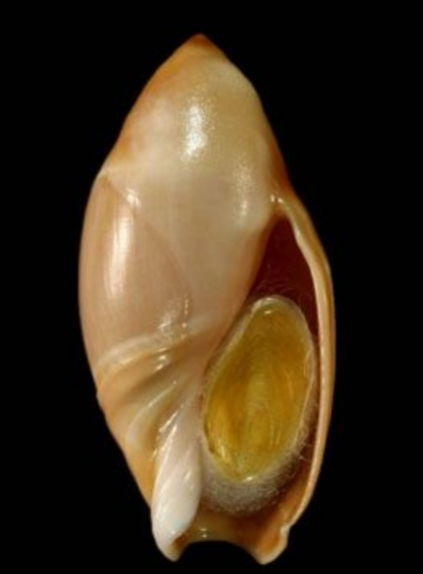
- Shell of Amalda mucronata (specimen at the Natural History Museum, Rotterdam)

Scientific classification
- Kingdom: Animalia
- Phylum: Mollusca
- Class: Gastropoda
- Subclass: Caenogastropoda
- Order: Neogastropoda
- Family: Ancillariidae
- Genus: Amalda
- Species: A. mucronata

Binomial name
- Amalda mucronata (G.B. Sowerby I, 1830)

Synonyms
- Amalda (Baryspira) mucronata (G. B. Sowerby I, 1830) alternative representation; Ancillaria mucronata G.B. Sowerby I, 1830 (original combination); † Baryspira erica Olson, 1956 (junior subjective synonym); † Baryspira gladiolaria Olson, 1956 (junior subjective synonym); Baryspira mucronata (G.B. Sowerby I, 1830)

= Amalda mucronata =

Species of gastropod

Amalda mucronata is a species of medium-sized sea snail, a marine gastropod mollusc in the family Ancillariidae.

These snails live in the sandy subtidal near-shore environment where they eat bivalves. Fossil material of this species provides evidence of morphological stasis over 5 million years.

== Shell description ==
The shell height is up to 61 mm, and the width is up to 27 mm.

(Original description) The solid, stubby shell is oblong, shiny and is pink to pale brown. The acuminated, callous spire is thickly coated in enamel. The pointed apex is paler. The body whorl features a white-bordered band near its upper section, while a faintly impressed line ends in a small, blunt tooth at the lower edge of the outer lip.

Two bands are visible near the lower part of the body whorl, with a very indistinct groove marking the beginning of the columellar varix, which is narrow, whitish, and subtly striated. The wide aperture is somewhat acute at the top and notched at the bottom. The outer lip is slightly thickened at the edge, with a single small tooth near the base. The upper portion of the inner lip extends over the spire. The columella shows a central ridge and is twisted anteriorly.

== Distribution ==
This marine species is endemic to and occurs off New Zealand.
