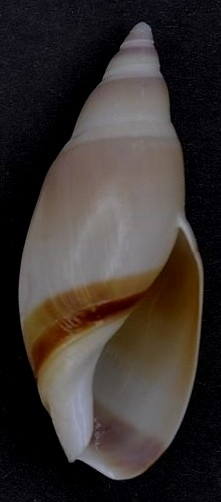
- Shell of Ancillista cingulata (specimen at Naturalis Biodiversity Center)

Scientific classification
- Kingdom: Animalia
- Phylum: Mollusca
- Class: Gastropoda
- Subclass: Caenogastropoda
- Order: Neogastropoda
- Family: Ancillariidae
- Genus: Ancillista
- Species: A. cingulata

Binomial name
- Ancillista cingulata (G.B. Sowerby I, 1830)

Synonyms
- Ancilla cingulata (G. B. Sowerby I, 1830); Ancillaria cingulata G. B. Sowerby I, 1830 (original combination)

= Ancillista cingulata =

Species of gastropod

Ancillista cingulata is a species of sea snail, a marine gastropod mollusk in the family Ancillariidae.

== Description ==
(Original description) The shell is oblong, pale brown, and thin, with a distinct suture. The whorls are swollen, with the upper ones being reddish-brown. The upper margin of each whorl has a rather broad white band, while the lower edge features a very small keel.

The body whorl has two smooth bands at the base, the upper one being reddish-brown. A depression separates the lower band from the columellar varix, which is narrow, thin, white, and very smooth.

== Distribution ==
This marine species is endemic to Australia and occurs off the Northern Territory, Queensland and Western Australia.
