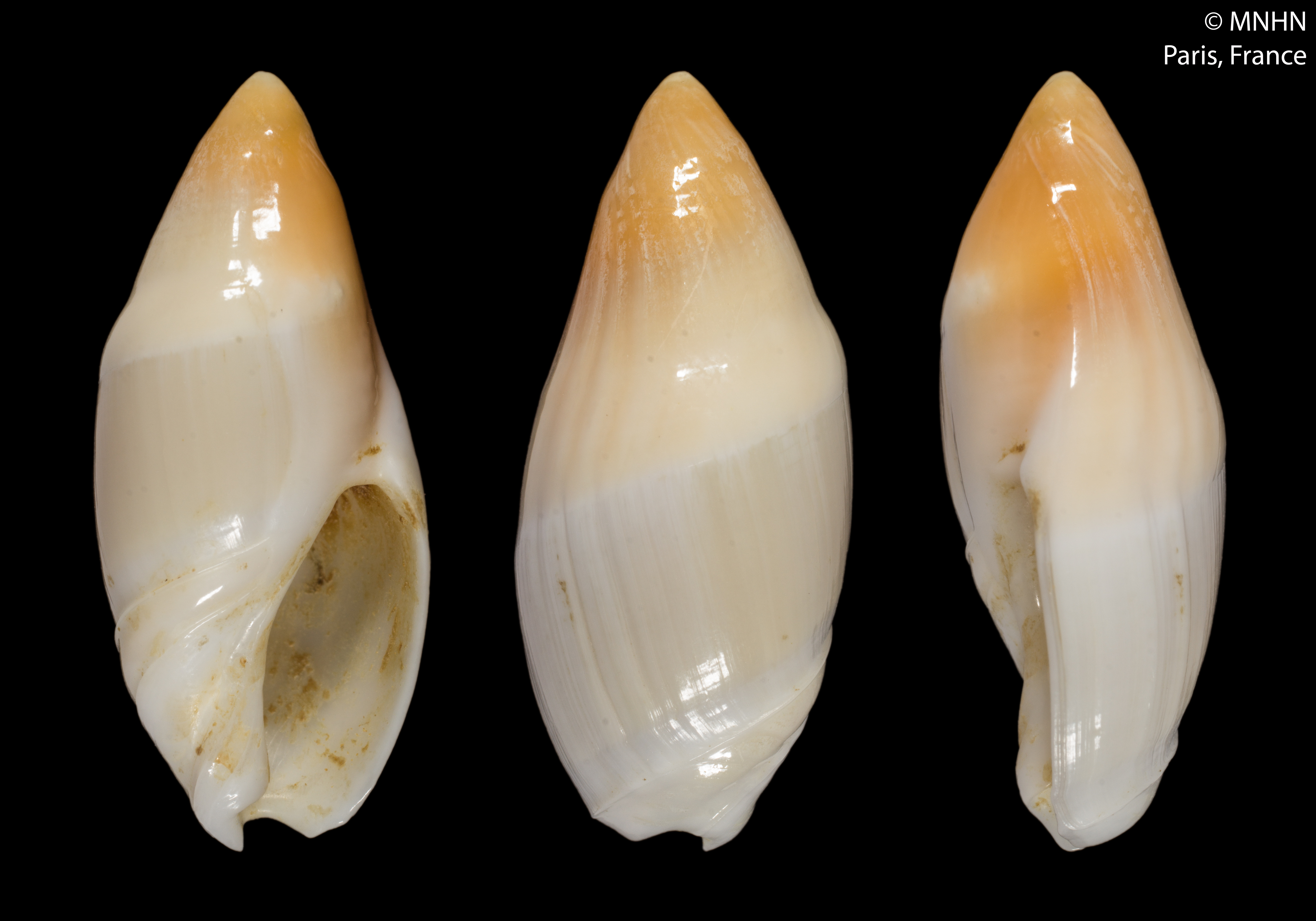
- Shell of Amalda allaryi (holotype at MNHN, Paris)

Scientific classification
- Kingdom: Animalia
- Phylum: Mollusca
- Class: Gastropoda
- Subclass: Caenogastropoda
- Order: Neogastropoda
- Family: Ancillariidae
- Genus: Amalda
- Species: A. allaryi

Binomial name
- Amalda allaryi Bozetti, 2007

Synonyms
- Amalda maritzae Bozzetti, 2007 (uncertain synonym)

= Amalda allaryi =

Species of gastropod

Amalda allaryi is a species of sea snail, a marine gastropod mollusc in the family Ancillariidae, the olives.

== Description ==
The length of the shell attains 65 mm.

The shell is ovate-fusiform with a cyrtoconoid spire (approaching a cone in shape, but with convex sides). The primary spire callus is thick and weakly micro-shagreened, covering all whorls except for 1–1.5 protoconch whorls, making it impossible to count or measure the whorls accurately. The first protoconch whorl has a diameter of 0.84–1.02 mm (mean 0.92 mm, n = 3). The secondary callus is also thick, merging seamlessly with the parietal callus without a visible border, and extends to the anterpenultimate whorl. The plication plate features 2–3 ridges, with the lowest one being the weakest, and the columella is smooth.

The olivoid groove is very shallow, almost indistinct, and the labral denticle is very small and obtuse. The upper anterior band is weakly convex, with the rear edge of the anterior plate distinctly thickened and raised above the surface of the upper anterior band, which is nearly flat. The lower anterior band is nearly flat and smooth.

The shell color ranges from very pale creamy to ivory. The primary callus varies from light to dark orange or brown, with strongly prosocline (i.e. with the growth lines leaning forward (adapically) with respect to the direction of the cone) lighter axial lines. The secondary callus is orange in its upper part. The olivoid band is slightly lighter than the body whorl cloak, while the upper anterior band matches the cloak's color, and the lower anterior band and plication plate are white.

== Distribution ==
This marine species is endemic to and occurs off New Caledonia.
