= Ancillista ngampitchae =

Scientific classification
- Kingdom: Animalia
- Phylum: Mollusca
- Class: Gastropoda
- Subclass: Caenogastropoda
- Order: Neogastropoda
- Family: Ancillariidae
- Genus: Ancillista
- Species: A. ngampitchae

Binomial name
- Ancillista ngampitchae Gra-Tes, 2002

Species of gastropod

Ancillista ngampitchae is a species of sea snail, a marine gastropod mollusk in the family Ancillariidae.

== Description ==
Introduction
During approximately the last ten years, bilateral fishing concessions between Thailand and countries in the region have expanded. Thai trawlers have been a major source of molluscan specimens from the deep sea from various locations around the region.
Rare and even very rare species have been trawled together with fish stock during trawling and dredging in deep waters. This includes other sea life from the deep seabed. Rare species have shown up in the dredging, including Volutoconus bednalli, Lyria kurodai, etc.
Ancillista ngampitchae sp. nov., is thin and fragile. The species was dredged in the Arafura Sea between the northern part of Australia and Indonesia. It is quite small compared to the net mesh used in the dredging. During dredging, these small fragile shells can easily pass through the net or break into pieces and get lost in the very deep sea before they can be brought up to the surface.
Ancillista ngampitchae sp. nov., is believed to be dredged from a sandy bottom. The reason to support this assumption is that the body of the shell is clean white with no trace of mud on the shell surface, as opposed to species dredged from deep muddy bottoms such as Zidona dufresnei Donovan, 1823 in the family Volutidae.

Description
Ancillista ngampitchae sp. nov. is small in size, about 25–33 mm in length, 13–16.8 mm wide. The shell is very light, thin, fragile, and semi-glossy translucent white. The shell has an ovate shape with the spire measuring about 1/3 of the whole length. It has 5 whorls with a narrow solid white stripe (callus) at the suture running from the apex to the last whorl. Between the solid white stripe and the whorl, there is a narrow shallow groove running parallel with it. The protoconch is round, smooth, and blunt. In all 4 specimens of the holotype and paratypes, the color of the protoconch is translucent white. The shell of Ancillista ngampitchae sp. nov. is 2 ovate and bulbous and the last whorl is prominent. The aperture is also ovate and very wide with a thin lip. Inside, the aperture is very glossy and shiny white. Ancillista ngampitchae sp.nov. has a wide siphonal canal and a very prominent siphonal fasciole. The base of the shell is solid white and is thicker than the body whorl. There are two deep narrow channels running parallel on the solid white base callus. One, is at the edge of the base, the other, is very close and runs parallel to it. The body whorl of Ancillista ngampitchae sp. nov. is smooth, semiglossy, but by using a magnifying glass, very fine vertical ribs are visible on the body whorl. In coloration, both interior and exterior, it is pure white with no other color.

Type Material
Holotype: 25 x 13 mm. L/W=1.923; W/L=0.52; preserved in the collection of the Phuket Marine Biological Center (PMBC) with the code number PMBC-16013.
Paratype A: 32 x 16.8. L/W=1.904; W/L=0.525. In the author's private collection with the No. CGSC1758-974.
Paratype B: 29.5 x 15. L/W=1.966; W/L=0.508. In the author's private collection with the No. CGSC1758-975.
Paratype C: 33 x 16.2. L/W=2.037; W/L=0.49. In the author's private collection with the No. CGSC1758-976.
All paratypes were trawled from the type location.
Etymology
The new species is named after Lieutenant Commander Ngampitch WRTN, the author's wife who was a great supporter and patiently waited in places where the author spent much time devoted to seashells.
Discussion
Ancillista ngampitchae sp. nov. is most closely related to Ancillista lineata Kiener, 1844 and Ancilista fusiformis Petterd, 1886.
The protoconch and apex of Ancillista ngampitchae sp. nov. is smooth, round, and white. The body is thin, white, translucent, and fragile.
Ancillista lineata Kiener, 1844 is cream, the spire callus on the apex is sometimes yellow. Central area of the body whorl with faint light brown zigzag axial lines and a spiral row of brown blotches anteriorly.
Ancilista fusiformis Petterd, 1886 is slender, with light cream-brown coloring on the body with a white stripe at the suture.
Ancillista ngampitchae sp. nov. differs from all species in the family in all characters: apex, color, shape, aperture, columella, siphonal canal, and prominent siphonal fasciole.

Description and comparison with related species
Ancillista ngampitchae sp. nov.
The shell is white, thin and translucent with broadly ovate-fusiform shape. The aperture is very wide, elongately ovate with a thin parietal callus. The shell has a prominent columella with a rounded ridge in the fasciole. Color translucent white with a white blunt round apex.
Locality: Arafura Sea, between the northern part of Australia and southern Indonesia, west of Irian Jaya.
Ancillista fusiformis Petterd, 1886
The shell is solid with broadly ovate-fusiform. The aperture is elongately ovate with thick parietal callus. The columella is short with fasciole ridge rounded. Color ranges from dark cream (very light brown) to white, with yellow apex, sometimes white. Locality: New South Wales to South Australia, on sand.
Ancillista lineata Kiener, 1844
The shell is solid and has a shape similar to Ancillista fusiformis Petterd, 1886 that is broadly ovate-fusiform. Spire is moderately tall and rounded. The apex color varies from yellow to white. The pattern of the body also varies, ranging from no pattern with yellow apex to a substantial band marked with thick, brown, irregular axial dashes. Central area of the whorl covered with faint light brown zigzag axial lines.
Locality: Southern part of Australia, ranging from Victoria to Fremantle, Western Australia.

== Distribution ==
This species occurs in the Arafura Sea between the northern part of Australia and Indonesia, trawled from 70 to 100 m.
