= Ancillista inhacaensis =

Scientific classification
- Kingdom: Animalia
- Phylum: Mollusca
- Class: Gastropoda
- Subclass: Caenogastropoda
- Order: Neogastropoda
- Family: Ancillariidae
- Genus: Ancillista
- Species: A. inhacaensis

Binomial name
- Ancillista inhacaensis T. Cossignani & Rosado, 2022

Species of gastropod

Ancillista inhacaensis is a species of sea snail, a marine gastropod mollusk in the family Ancillariidae.

== Distribution ==
This marine species occurs in the Mozambique Channel
