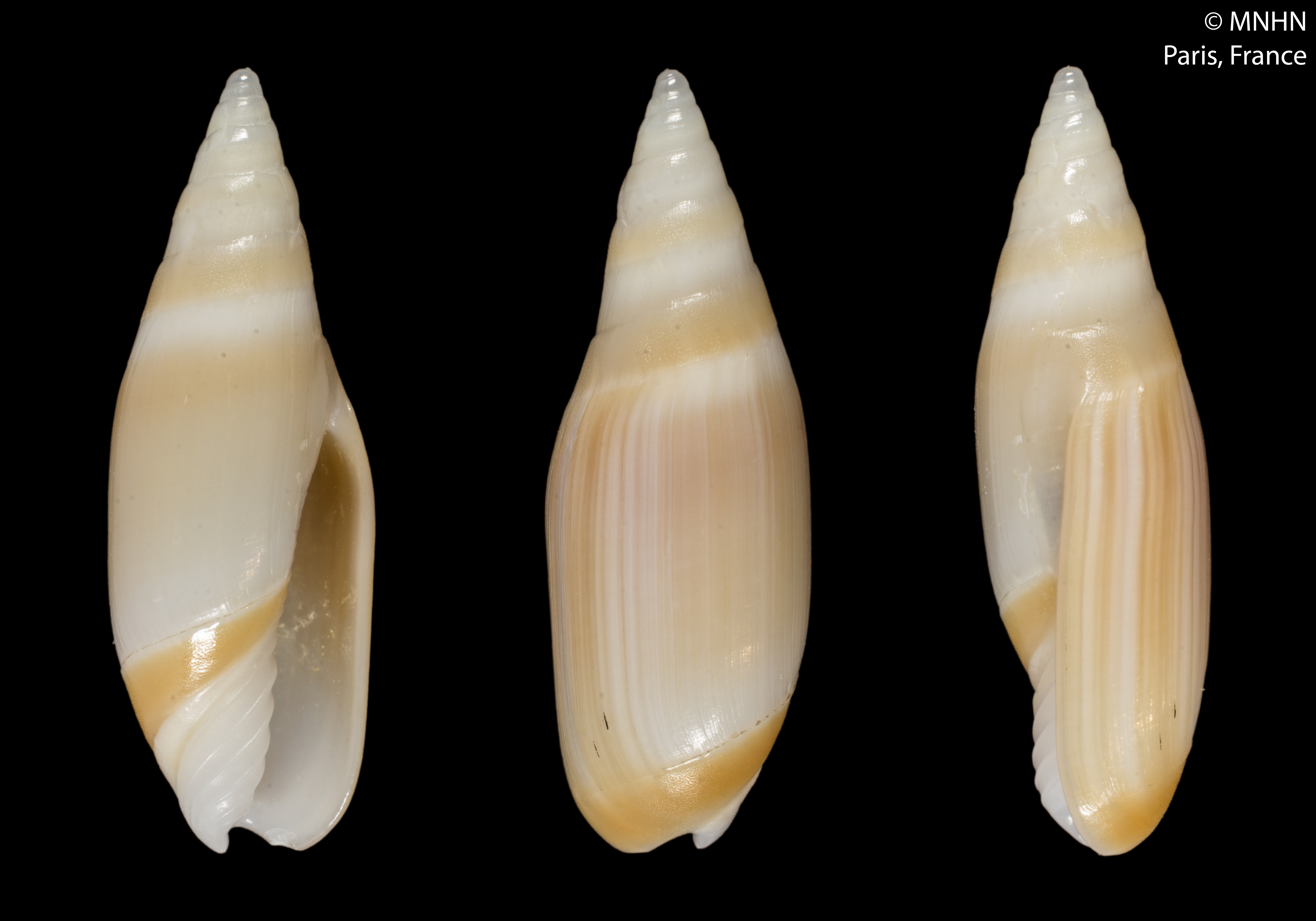

Scientific classification
- Kingdom: Animalia
- Phylum: Mollusca
- Class: Gastropoda
- Subclass: Caenogastropoda
- Order: Neogastropoda
- Family: Ancillariidae
- Genus: Entomoliva
- Species: E. incisa

Binomial name
- Entomoliva incisa Bouchet & Kilburn, 1991

= Entomoliva incisa =

Species of gastropod

Entomoliva incisa is a species of sea snail, a marine gastropod mollusc in the family Ancillariidae.

== Description ==
The length of the shell attains 20.5 mm.

== Distribution ==
This marine species occurs off New Caledonia.
