= Ancillista rosadoi =

Scientific classification
- Kingdom: Animalia
- Phylum: Mollusca
- Class: Gastropoda
- Subclass: Caenogastropoda
- Order: Neogastropoda
- Family: Ancillariidae
- Genus: Ancillista
- Species: A. rosadoi

Binomial name
- Ancillista rosadoi Bozetti & Terzer, 2004

Species of gastropod

Ancillista rosadoi is a species of sea snail, a marine gastropod mollusk in the family Ancillariidae.

== Description ==
Ancillista rosadoii is an olive-hued marine snail measuring about 24mm long.

== Distribution ==
This species occurs in the West Indian Ocean near Mozambique.
