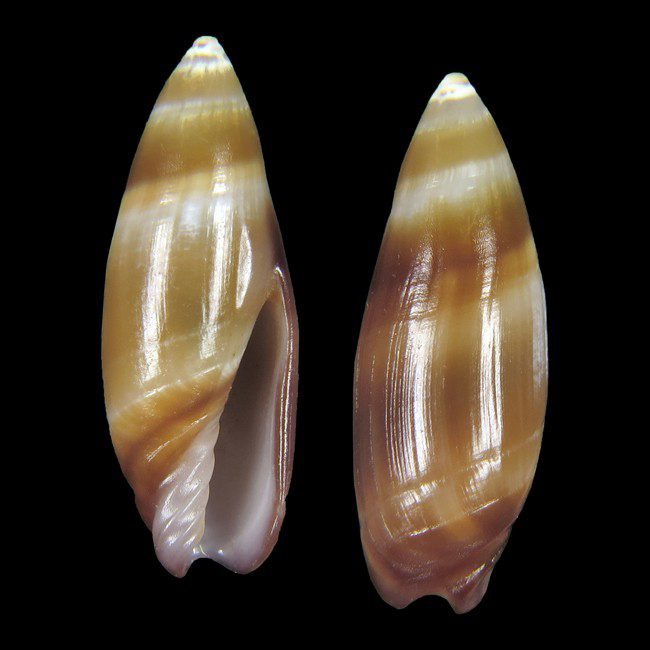
- Shell of Turrancilla reboriae

Scientific classification
- Kingdom: Animalia
- Phylum: Mollusca
- Class: Gastropoda
- Subclass: Caenogastropoda
- Order: Neogastropoda
- Family: Ancillariidae
- Genus: Turrancilla
- Species: T. reboriae

Binomial name
- Turrancilla reboriae (Poppe, Tagaro & Goto, 2018)

Synonyms
- Ancilla reboriae Poppe, Tagaro & Goto, 2018

= Turrancilla reboriae =

Species of gastropod

Turrancilla reboriae is a species of sea snail, a marine gastropod mollusk in the family Ancillariidae.

== Original Description ==
- Poppe G.T., Tagaro S.P. & Goto Y. (2018). New marine species from the Central Philippines. Visaya. 5(1): 91–135. page(s): 102, pl. 8 figs 1–3.
