= Amalda beachportensis =

Scientific classification
- Kingdom: Animalia
- Phylum: Mollusca
- Class: Gastropoda
- Subclass: Caenogastropoda
- Order: Neogastropoda
- Family: Ancillariidae
- Genus: Amalda
- Species: A. beachportensis

Binomial name
- Amalda beachportensis (Verco, 1909)

Synonyms
- Alocospira beachportensis (Verco, 1909); Ancilla beachportensis Verco, 1909; Baryspira beachportensis (Verco, 1909)

Species of gastropod

Amalda beachportensis is a species of sea snail, a marine gastropod mollusk in the family Ancillariidae.

== Taxonomy ==
Status uncertain.

== Description ==
Amalda beachportensis is 20.5 mm in length and 9.5 mm in width on average.

The triangularyly-oval aperture has a width of 12 mm with a narrow behind. The outer lip is simple and thin with a tooth near its anterior end.

== Distribution ==
This marine species is endemic to Australia and occurs off South Australia.
