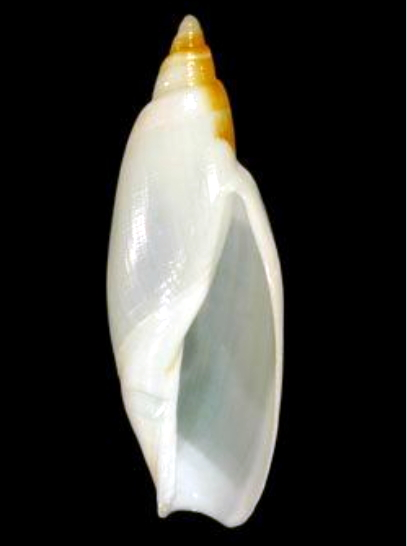
- Shell of Ancillista muscae (specimen at the Natural History Museum, Rotterdam)

Scientific classification
- Kingdom: Animalia
- Phylum: Mollusca
- Class: Gastropoda
- Subclass: Caenogastropoda
- Order: Neogastropoda
- Family: Ancillariidae
- Genus: Ancillista
- Species: A. muscae

Binomial name
- Ancillista muscae (Pilsbry, 1926)

Synonyms
- Amalda elongata (Gray, 1874); Ancilla muscae Pilsbry, 1926; Ancillaria elongata Gray, 1874

= Ancillista muscae =

Species of gastropod

Ancillista muscae is a species of sea snail, a marine gastropod mollusk in the family Ancillariidae, the olives.

== Nomenclature ==
Ancilla muscae is nomen novum for Ancillaria elongata Gray, 1847 and Ancillaria elongata Deshayes, 1830

== Description ==
The length of the shell attains 49 mm.

(Original description as Ancillaria elongata) The shell is ovate, elongated and imperforate. It is white, thin, and smooth. Its conical spire makes up one-third of the shell's length and is rather blunt at the top. The upper whorls feature spiral ridges, while the body whorl is marked with spiral striations and subtle concentric wrinkles.

The anterior enamel belt is a single band of polished white. The posterior enamel belt is similar but somewhat wider. The columella is quite curved and lacks any folds. The aperture is elongated and ovate, with a white throat.

== Distribution ==
This marine species is endemic to Australia and occurs off the Northern Territory, Queensland and Western Australia.
