= Ancillista fernandesi =

Scientific classification
- Kingdom: Animalia
- Phylum: Mollusca
- Class: Gastropoda
- Subclass: Caenogastropoda
- Order: Neogastropoda
- Family: Ancillariidae
- Genus: Ancillista
- Species: A. fernandesi

Binomial name
- Ancillista fernandesi Kilburn & Jenner, 1977

Species of gastropod

Ancillista fernandesi is a species of sea snail, a marine gastropod mollusk in the family Ancillariidae.

== Description ==
Shell size 70-75 mm.

== Distribution ==
This marine species occurs off South Mozambique, trawled at 80-120 meters depth.
