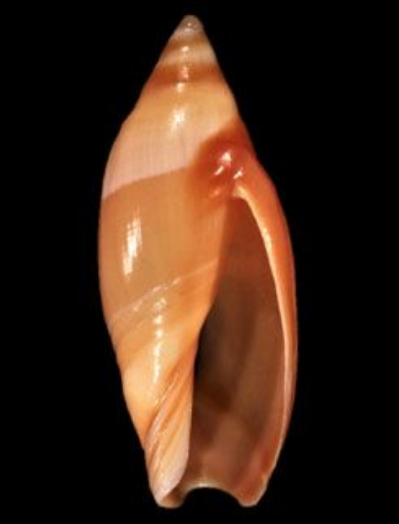
- Shell of Amalda dimidiata (specimen at the Natural History Museum, Rotterdam)

Scientific classification
- Kingdom: Animalia
- Phylum: Mollusca
- Class: Gastropoda
- Subclass: Caenogastropoda
- Order: Neogastropoda
- Family: Ancillariidae
- Genus: Amalda
- Species: A. dimidiata

Binomial name
- Amalda dimidiata (G.B. Sowerby II, 1859)

Synonyms
- Ancilla dimidiata (G. B. Sowerby II, 1859); Ancillaria dimidiata G. B. Sowerby II, 1859 (original combination)

= Amalda dimidiata =

Species of gastropod

Amalda dimidiata is a species of sea snail, a marine gastropod mollusk in the family Ancillariidae.

== Description ==
(Original description in Latin) The thin shell is elongated. It is white with a tawny tint above the suture. The spire is elevated, with whorls that are gently rounded. A callous layer extends to the midpoint of the body whorl, featuring a doubled lower band. The outer lip bears a single tooth, while the varix is elongated, narrow, and grooved.

This thin, pale species presents a medium in respect of the extension of the spire-covering enamel, which reaches nearly halfway down on the body whorl.

== Distribution ==
This species occurs in the Atlantic Ocean off Brazil.
