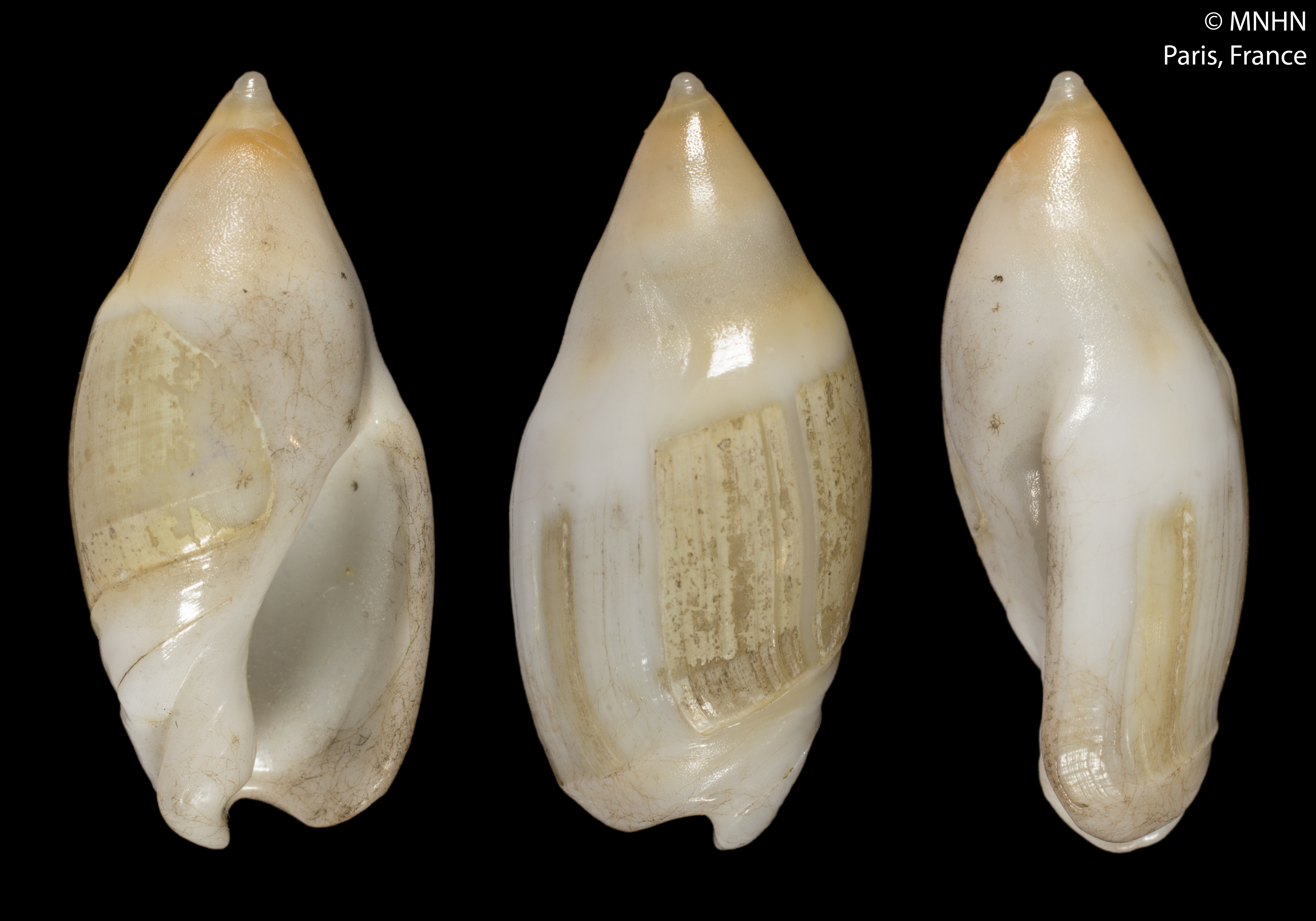
- Shell of Amalda crosnieri (holotype at MNHN, Paris)

Scientific classification
- Kingdom: Animalia
- Phylum: Mollusca
- Class: Gastropoda
- Subclass: Caenogastropoda
- Order: Neogastropoda
- Family: Ancillariidae
- Genus: Amalda
- Species: A. crosnieri

Binomial name
- Amalda crosnieri Kilburn, 1977

= Amalda crosnieri =

Species of gastropod

Amalda crosnieri is a species of sea snail, a marine gastropod mollusc in the family Ancillariidae, the olives.

== Description ==
The length of the shell attains 23.2 mm, its diameter is 10.5 mm.

== Distribution ==
This marine species was found northwestern Madagascar.
