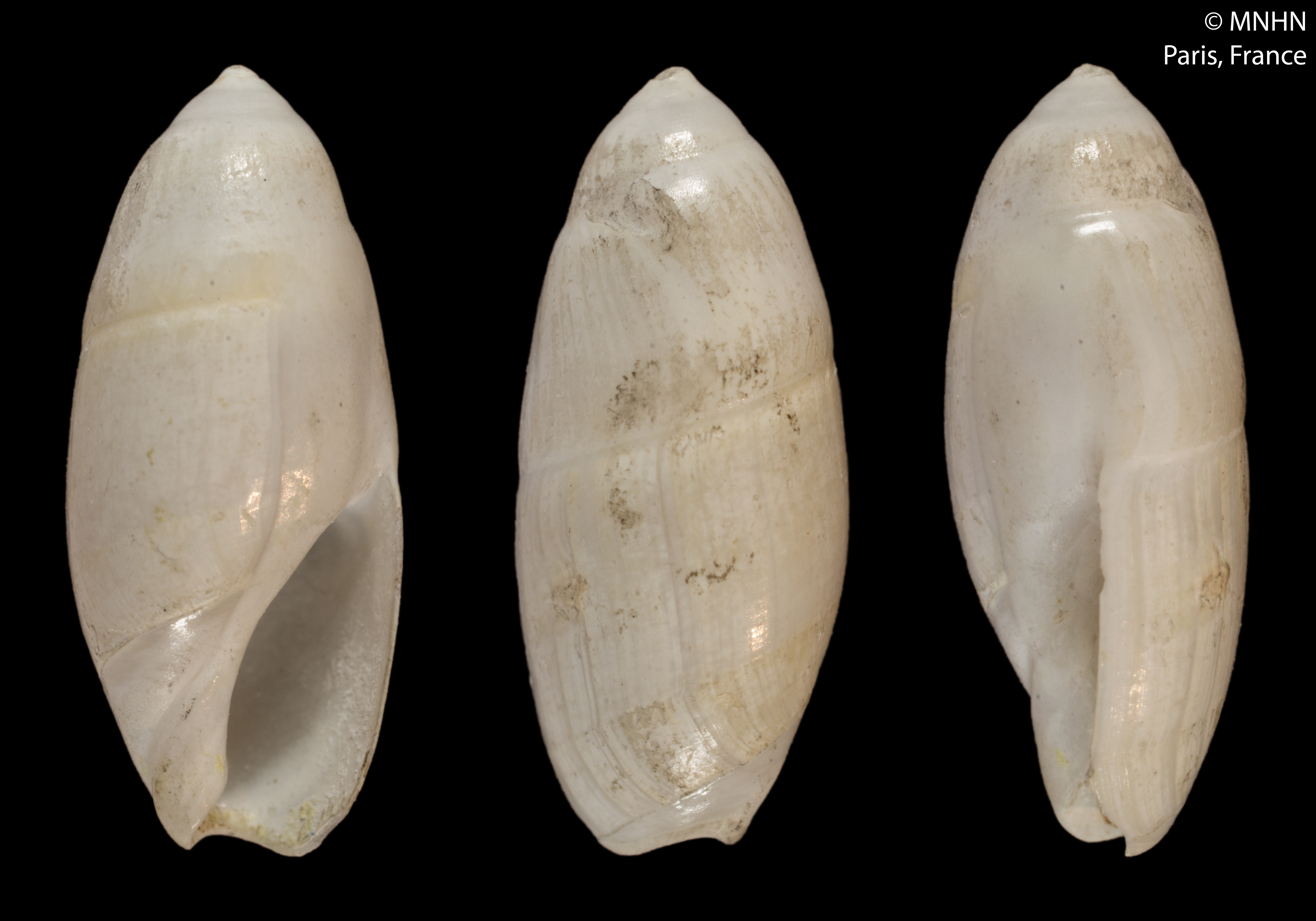
- Shell of Turrancilla sibuetae

Scientific classification
- Kingdom: Animalia
- Phylum: Mollusca
- Class: Gastropoda
- Subclass: Caenogastropoda
- Order: Neogastropoda
- Family: Ancillariidae
- Genus: Turrancilla
- Species: T. sibuetae

Binomial name
- Turrancilla sibuetae Kantor & Bouchet, 1999

Synonyms
- Amalda sibuetae Kantor & Bouchet, 1999 (original combination)

= Turrancilla sibuetae =

Species of gastropod

Turrancilla sibuetae is a species of sea snail, a marine gastropod mollusc in the family Ancillariidae, the olives.

== Distribution ==
This species is distributed in the Northwest Atlantic Ocean.
