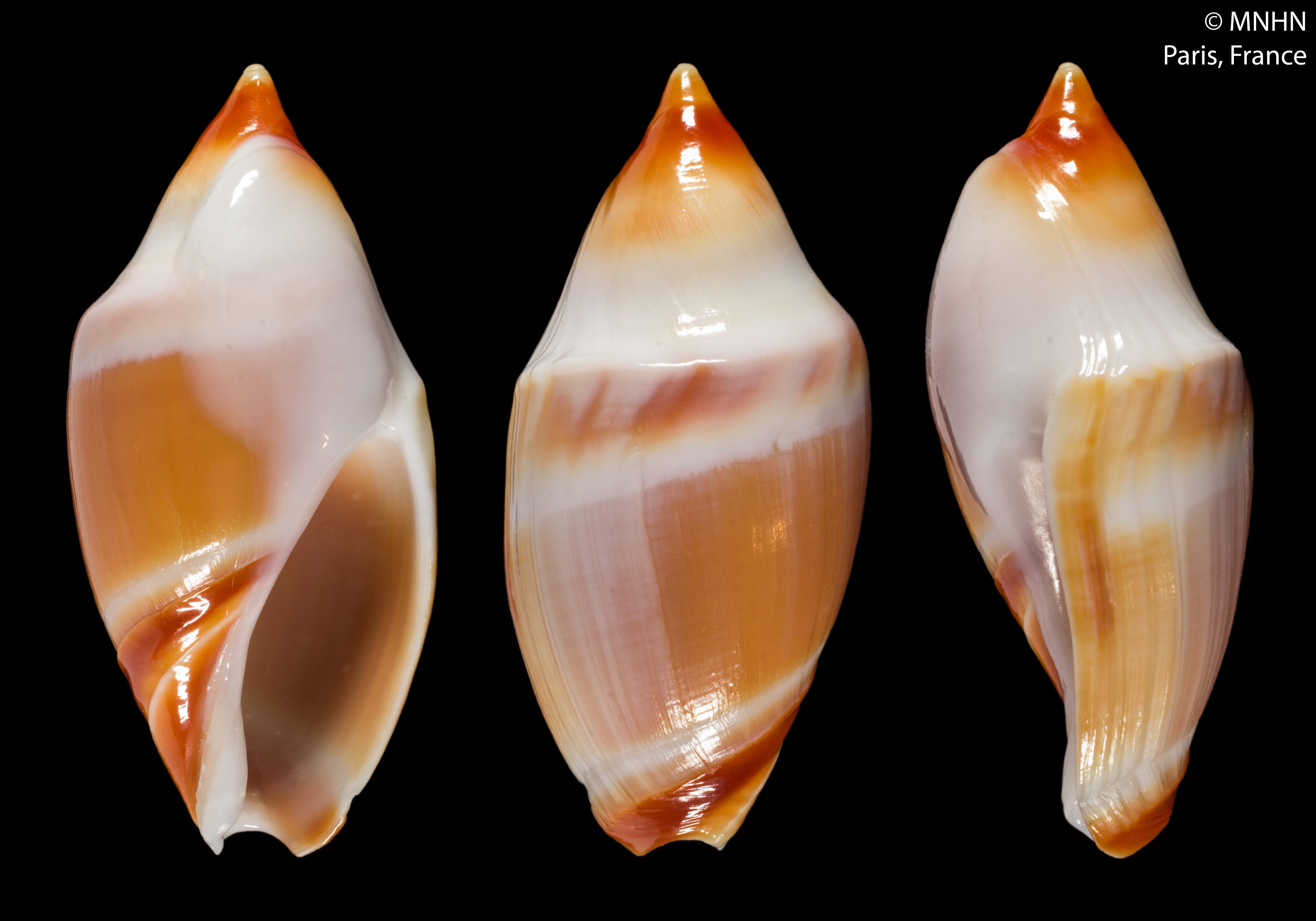
- Shell of Amalda coriolis (holotype at MNHN, Paris)

Scientific classification
- Kingdom: Animalia
- Phylum: Mollusca
- Class: Gastropoda
- Subclass: Caenogastropoda
- Order: Neogastropoda
- Family: Ancillariidae
- Genus: Amalda
- Species: A. coriolis

Binomial name
- Amalda coriolis Kilburn & Bouchet, 1988

= Amalda coriolis =

Species of gastropod

Amalda coriolis is a species of sea snail, a marine gastropod mollusk in the family Ancillariidae, the olives.

== Description ==
The length of the shell attains 48.9 mm.

The shell is biconic-ovate, featuring a narrow base and a high, sharply conical spire. The body whorl is angulated just below the suture. The primary spire callus is thick and micro-shagreened, covering all whorls except for 1–1.5 protoconch whorls and exhibiting very faint spiral ridges. The protoconch is large and low-domed, with the first whorl measuring 0.95–1.13 mm in diameter (mean 1.06 mm, n = 5). The secondary callus is very thick, seamlessly merging with the parietal callus without a visible border, and forming a prominent pad that reaches the adapical suture of the antepenultimate whorl.

The plication plate has 1–4 ridges, with only the adapical one being distinct, and the columella is smooth. The olivoid groove is distinct, while the denticle of the outer lip is not prominent. The upper anterior band is weakly convex, featuring a rounded, subtle submedian ridge, while the lower anterior band is nearly flat and micro-shagreened.

The primary callus ranges from very light yellowish to dark orange-brown in the upper part, with a white to creamy spiral band in the lower part. The secondary callus is white to creamy. The body whorl cloak varies from white to orange, the olivoid band is nearly white, the upper anterior band ranges from yellowish to dark brown, and the lower anterior band ranges from white to orange-brown. The plication plate is white.

== Distribution ==
This marine species was found on the Lord Howe Ridge, Coral Sea at a depth of 270 m.
