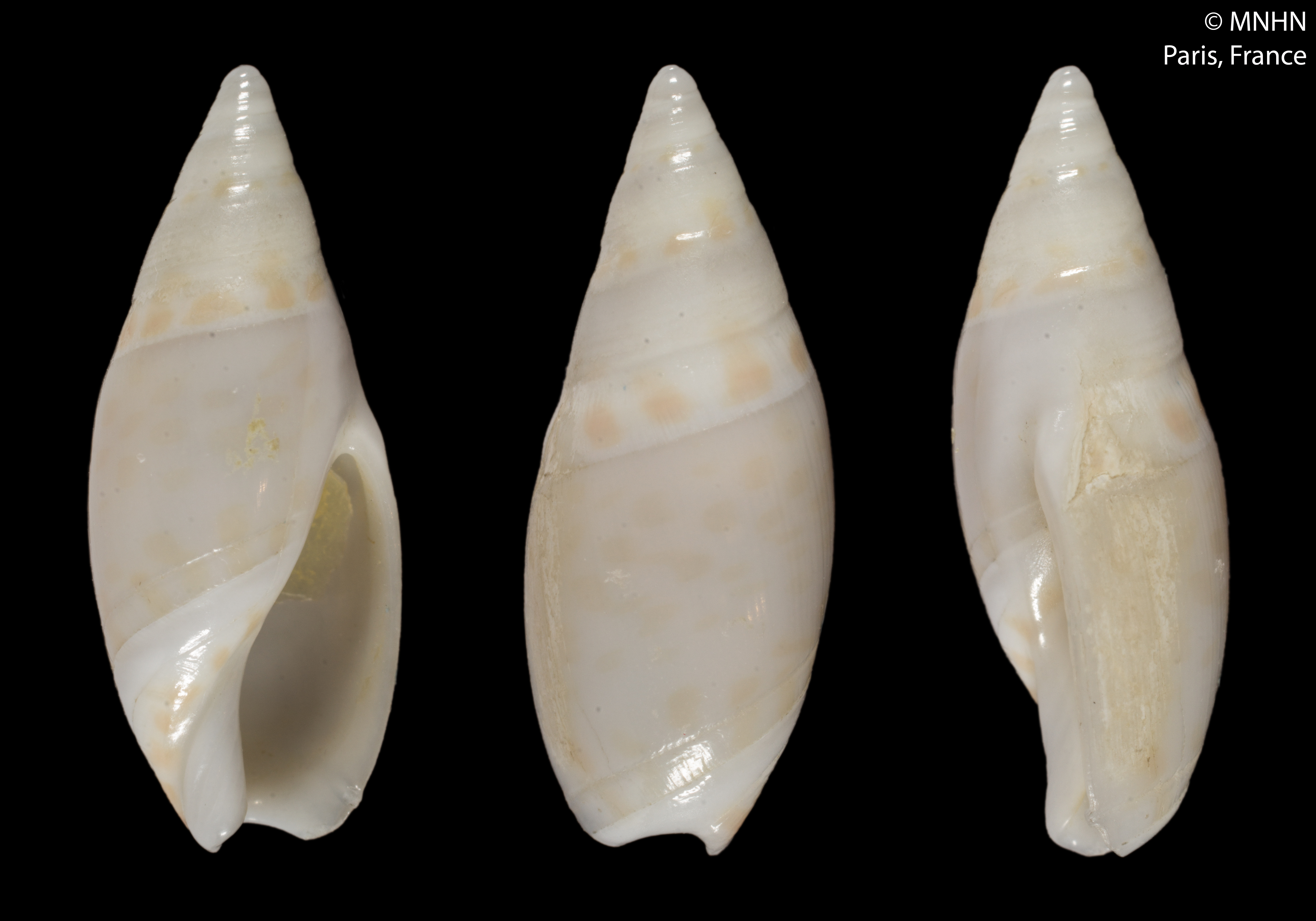
- Shell of Amalda bellonarum (holotype at MNHN? Paris)

Scientific classification
- Kingdom: Animalia
- Phylum: Mollusca
- Class: Gastropoda
- Subclass: Caenogastropoda
- Order: Neogastropoda
- Family: Ancillariidae
- Genus: Amalda
- Species: A. bellonarum

Binomial name
- Amalda bellonarum Kilburn & Bouchet, 1988

= Amalda bellonarum =

Species of gastropod

Amalda bellonarum is a species of sea snail, a marine gastropod mollusk in the family Ancillariidae.

== Description ==
The length of the shell attains 15 mm.

The shell is oblong-fusiform with a high spire. The callus of the primary spire is thin and glossy, covering all the whorls, including most of the protoconch, which makes accurate measurements difficult. It has distinct spiral lirae, with 6–7 on the penultimate whorl. The secondary callus is thin, with indistinct borders, narrow, and nearly reaches the antepenultimate whorl. The plication plate has 3–4 ridges. The olivoid groove is deep and prominent, while the denticle of the outer lip is weak and rounded. The anterior band is poorly divided, with a narrower upper band and a broader lower band, both almost flat.

The shell color is a uniform greyish-white, with rows of faint yellow-orange spots, one subsutural and another on the olivoid and anterior bands.

== Distribution ==
This species occurs on the Chesterfield-Bellona Plateau in the Coral Sea at depths between 45 m and 240 m.
