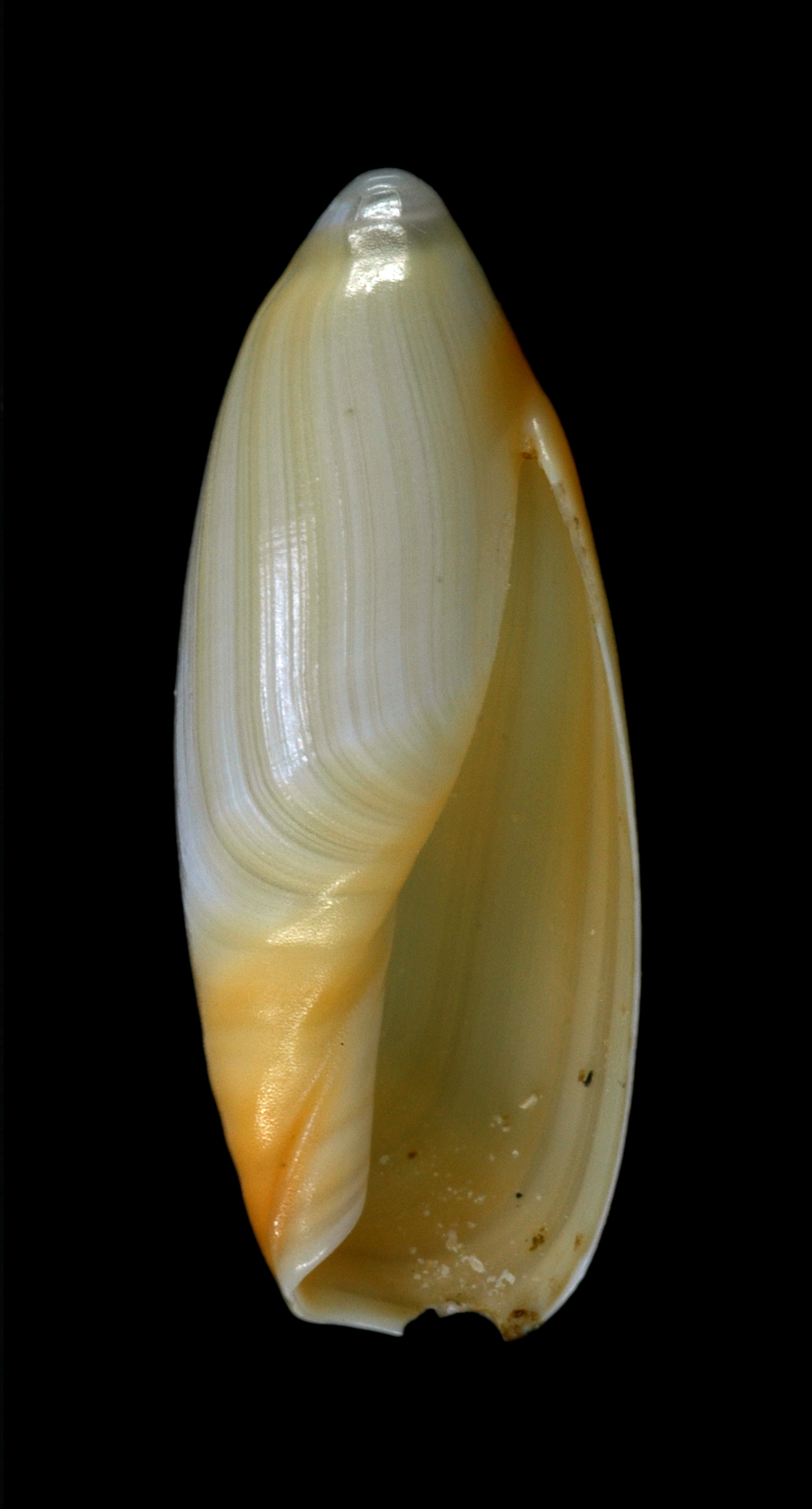
- Shell of Ancillista aureocallosa (specimen at MNHN Paris)

Scientific classification
- Kingdom: Animalia
- Phylum: Mollusca
- Class: Gastropoda
- Subclass: Caenogastropoda
- Order: Neogastropoda
- Family: Ancillariidae
- Genus: Ancillista
- Species: A. aureocallosa

Binomial name
- Ancillista aureocallosa Kilburn & Jenner, 1977

Synonyms
- Ancilla aureocallosa (Kilburn & Jenner, 1977)

= Ancillista aureocallosa =

Species of gastropod

Ancillista aureocallosa is a species of sea snail, a marine gastropod mollusk in the family Ancillariidae.

== Description ==
Shell size 20 mm.

== Distribution ==
This marine species occurs off South Mozambique.
