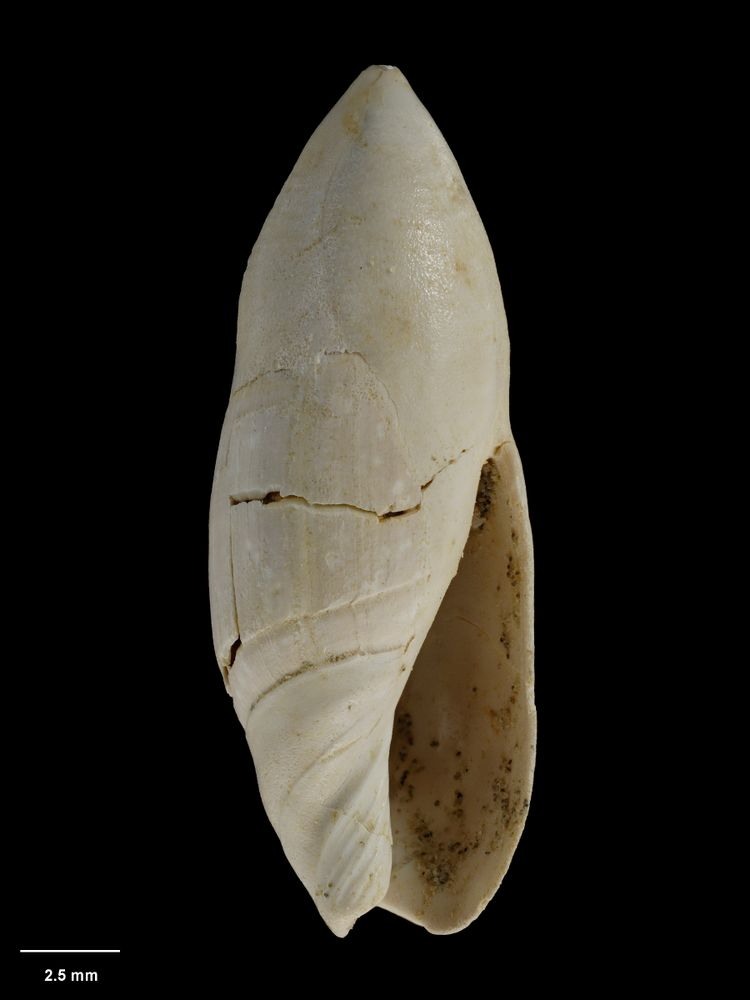
- Shell of Alocospira electa (specimen in the Museum of New Zealand)

Scientific classification
- Kingdom: Animalia
- Phylum: Mollusca
- Class: Gastropoda
- Subclass: Caenogastropoda
- Order: Neogastropoda
- Family: Ancillariidae
- Genus: Alocospira; Cossmann, 1899

Type species
- † Ancillaria papillata Tate, 1889

Synonyms
- Amalda (Alocospira) Cossmann, 1899 ·; † Ancilla (Alocospira) Cossmann, 1899; Baryspira (Alocospira) Cossmann, 1899 ·

= Alocospira =

Alocospira Temporal range: Paleocene–Recent

Genus of gastropods

Alocospira is a genus of sea snails, marine gastropod mollusks in the family Ancillariidae.

== Description ==
(Original description in French) The shell is of average size, with an olivoïd shape that is slightly swollen. Its spire is somewhat long, with a conical curve, and it is not fully covered by a rather thin callus that barely extends past the shell's axis.

The protoconch is a tiny, projecting button. The whorls are subulate (tapering to a point) and separated by a shallow dip that shows where the sutures are under the glaze. These whorls are decorated with faint spiral grooves that separate slightly raised cords.

The body whorl is oval, tapering evenly toward the front. It isn't grooved above the glaze's edge and has a fairly tall unglazed section. A deep groove, bordered by two thin lines, separates this area from the base of the shell. The base itself is split into two parts by a distinct depression that matches the growth of the notch.

The aperture is slightly widened, oval in the middle, and angled at the back. The aperture is abruptly truncated at the front by a wide, shallow notch. The outer lip is thin and nearly straight, with a small denticle opposite the lower groove on the base.

The columella is slightly curved inward and cut short at the front near the notch. It has four slanting folds that are all different in size and spacing, with the back one being thicker and farther apart. The columellar margin is thin and slightly callous, sometimes with some of the spire's grooves extending onto it.

== Species ==
- † Alocospira cuppedia (O. P. Olson, 1956)
- † Alocospira electa (Marwick, 1929)
- † Alocospira hebera (F. W. Hutton, 1873)
- † Alocospira komata (P. A. Maxwell, 1992)
- † Alocospira orycta (Tate, 1889)
- † Alocospira paeroa (C. A. Fleming, 1943)
- † Alocospira papillata (Tate, 1889)
- Alocospira rosea J. H. Macpherson, 1959
- † Alocospira subhebera (Marwick, 1926)
- † Alocospira tornata (Cossmann, 1903)

Synonyms

- Alocospira edithae (Pritchard & Gatliff, 1899): synonym of Amalda edithae (Pritchard & Gatliff, 1899)
- Alocospira fusiformis (Petterd, 1886): synonym of Amalda petterdi (Tate, 1893) (invalid: not J. Sowerby, 1850)
