= Ancillista albicans =

Scientific classification
- Kingdom: Animalia
- Phylum: Mollusca
- Class: Gastropoda
- Subclass: Caenogastropoda
- Order: Neogastropoda
- Family: Ancillariidae
- Genus: Ancillista
- Species: A. albicans

Binomial name
- Ancillista albicans Lee & Wu, 1997

Species of gastropod

Ancillista albicans is a species of sea snail, a marine gastropod mollusk in the family Ancillariidae.

== Distribution ==
This species occurs in the South China Sea.
