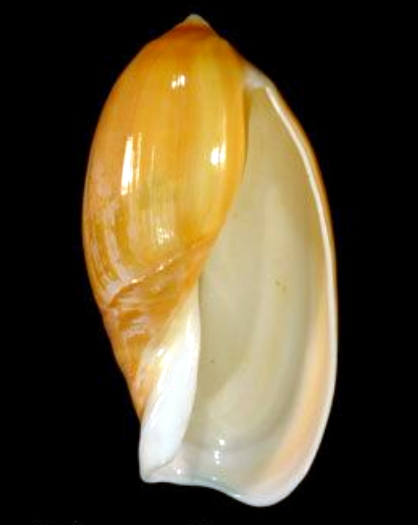
- Shell of Anolacia mauritiana (specimen at theNatural History Museum, Rotterdam)

Scientific classification
- Kingdom: Animalia
- Phylum: Mollusca
- Class: Gastropoda
- Subclass: Caenogastropoda
- Order: Neogastropoda
- Family: Ancillariidae
- Genus: Anolacia
- Species: A. mauritiana

Binomial name
- Anolacia mauritiana (G.B. Sowerby I, 1830)

Synonyms
- Ancilla mauritiana G.B. Sowerby I, 1830; Ancillaria mauritiana G.B. Sowerby I, 1830; Ancillaria torosa G.B. Sowerby II, 1859; Ancillaria volutella Deshayes, 1831; Cylindrus torosus Meuschen, 1787 (unavailable name: published in a rejected work)

= Anolacia mauritiana =

Species of gastropod

Anolacia mauritiana is a species of sea snail, a marine gastropod mollusk in the family Ancillariidae.

== Description ==
The length of the shell attains 45 mm.

(Original description in Latin of Ancillaria torosa) The shell is subcylindrical, longitudinally striated, and can be chestnut, pale tawny, or white. The spire is short, with subquadrate (somewhat square-shaped) whorls. The lower band is simple. The aperture is large, wide at the base, and hardly notched. The varix is white, lightly striated, and elongated.

This species is remarkable for the width and length of the aperture in proportion to its very short spire.

== Distribution ==
This marine species occurs off Somalia.
