= Turrancilla akontistes =

Scientific classification
- Kingdom: Animalia
- Phylum: Mollusca
- Class: Gastropoda
- Subclass: Caenogastropoda
- Order: Neogastropoda
- Family: Ancillariidae
- Genus: Turrancilla
- Species: T. akontistes

Binomial name
- Turrancilla akontistes Kilburn, 1980

Synonyms
- Ancillaria lanceolata Martens, 1901 (invalid: junior homonym of Ancillaria lanceolara Tate, 1889; Ancillus akontistes is a replacement name); Ancillus akontistes Kilburn, 1980 (basionym)

Species of gastropod

Turrancilla akontistes is a species of sea snail, a marine gastropod mollusk in the family Ancillariidae.

== Distribution ==
This species occurs in the Indian Ocean off Mozambique.
