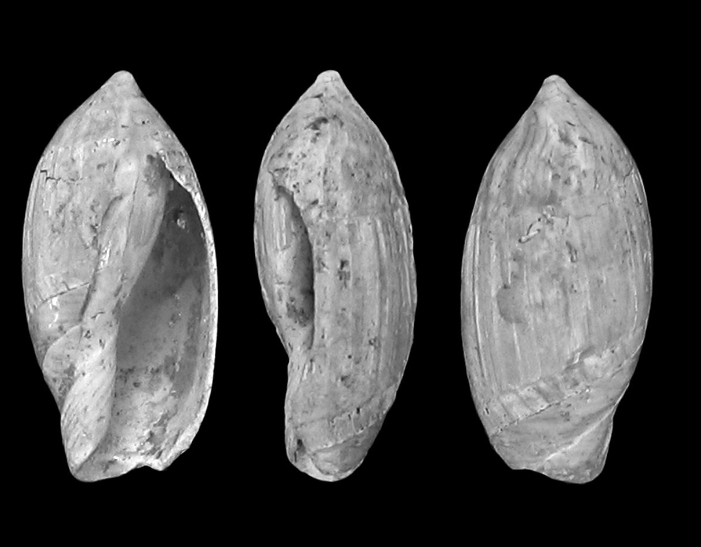
- Shell of Anolacia aperta (syntype at MNHN, Paris)

Scientific classification
- Kingdom: Animalia
- Phylum: Mollusca
- Class: Gastropoda
- Subclass: Caenogastropoda
- Order: Neogastropoda
- Family: Ancillariidae
- Genus: Anolacia
- Species: A. aperta

Binomial name
- Anolacia aperta (G.B. Sowerby I, 1825)

Synonyms
- Ancilla aperta (G. B. Sowerby I, 1825); Ancillaria aperta G. B. Sowerby I, 1825 (original combination)

= Anolacia aperta =

Species of gastropod

Anolacia aperta is a species of sea snail, a marine gastropod mollusk in the family Ancillariidae.

== Taxonomy ==
Status uncertain.

== Description ==
(Original description in Latin) The shell is oblong, cylindrically ventricose (swollen) and orange.

The spire is very short and blunt. The sutures are round and impressed. The body whorl has a single basal girdle and a groove above the varix, which is white and obliquely striated. The aperture is very large and pale, blunt at the top. The outer lip is toothless and smooth at the base.

== Distribution ==
Fossils of this marine species were found in Paleogene strata in Loire-Atlantique, France.
