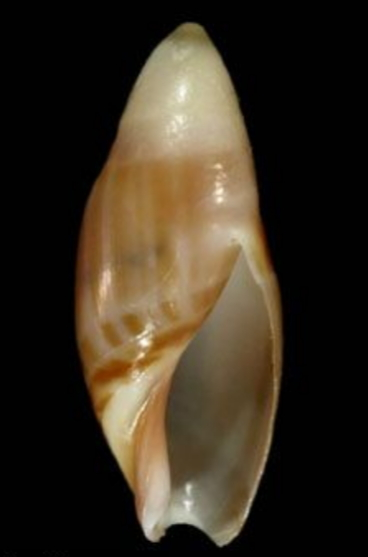
- Shell of Amalda roscoae (specimen at thenNatural History Museum, Rotterdam)

Scientific classification
- Kingdom: Animalia
- Phylum: Mollusca
- Class: Gastropoda
- Subclass: Caenogastropoda
- Order: Neogastropoda
- Family: Ancillariidae
- Genus: Amalda
- Species: A. roscoae

Binomial name
- Amalda roscoae Kilburn, 1975

Synonyms
- Amalda (Alocospira) roscoae Kilburn, 1975 superseded combination

= Amalda roscoae =

Species of gastropod

Amalda roscoae is a species of sea snail, a marine gastropod mollusk in the family Ancillariidae.

== Description ==
The length of the shell attains 22 mm. x diameter 8 mm.

== Distribution ==
This marine species occurs off Mozambique.
