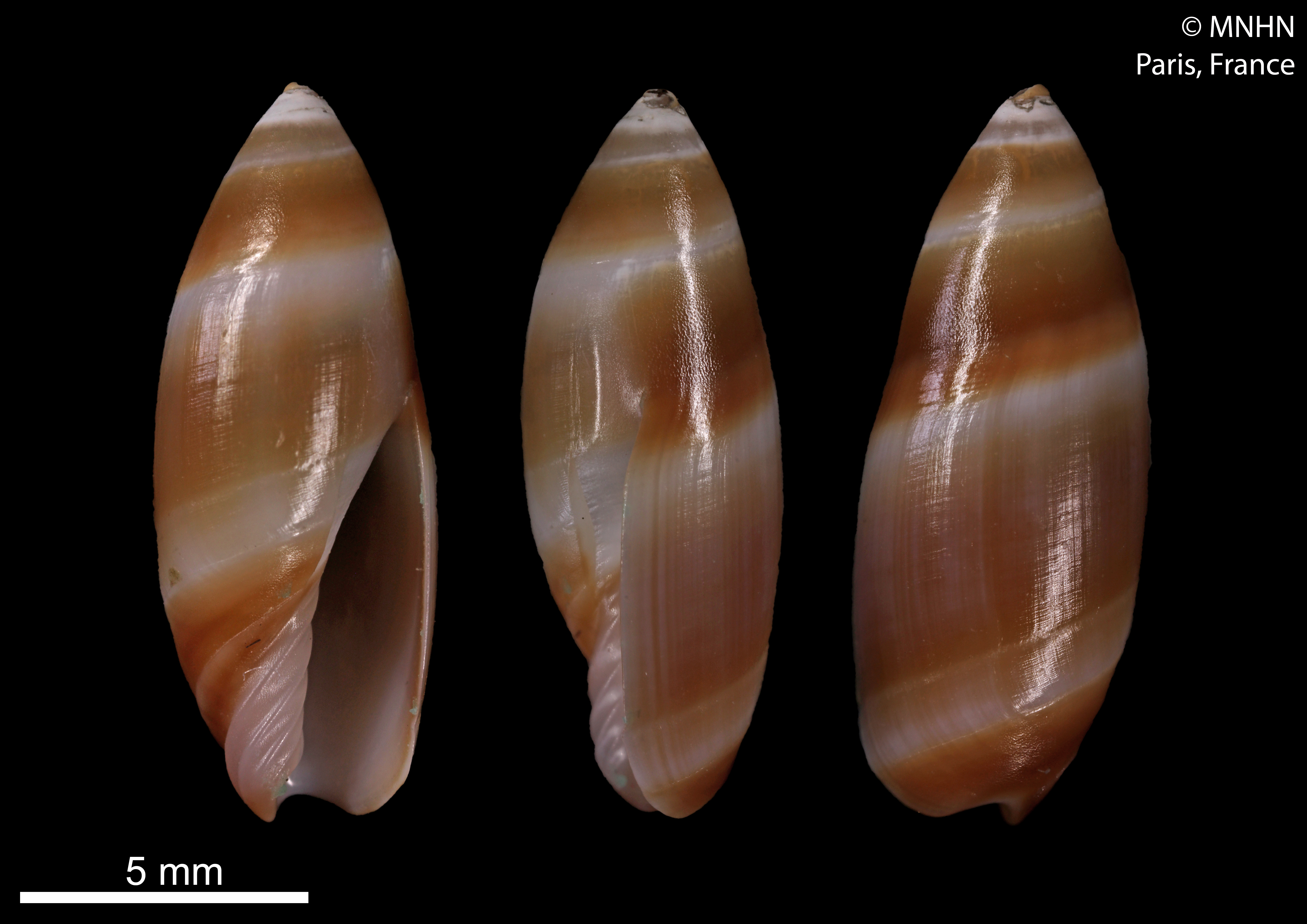
- Shell of Ancilla reboriae (paratype at MNHN, Paris)

Scientific classification
- Kingdom: Animalia
- Phylum: Mollusca
- Class: Gastropoda
- Subclass: Caenogastropoda
- Order: Neogastropoda
- Family: Ancillariidae
- Genus: Turrancilla; Martens, 1903

Type species
- Ancillaria lanceolata Martens, 1901

Synonyms
- Ancilla (Turrancilla) E. von Martens, 1904 ·; Ancillaria (Turrancilla) Martens, 1904 (original rank); Ancillus (Turrancilla) Martens, 1904

= Turrancilla =

Genus of gastropods

Turrancilla is a genus of sea snails, marine gastropod mollusks in the family Ancillariidae.

== Species ==
Species within the genus Turrancilla include:

- Turrancilla akontistes Kilburn, 1980
- Turrancilla alcocki (E. A. Smith, 1906)
- Turrancilla apicalis (Ninomiya, 1988)
- Turrancilla glans (E. A. Smith, 1899)
- Turrancilla heraldei Kantor, Strano, Vervaet, Weddingen, Puillandre, 2025
- Turrancilla monachalis (Ninomiya, 1988)
- Turrancilla reboriae (Poppe, Tagaro & Goto, 2018)
- Turrancilla sibuetae (Kantor & Bouchet, 1999)
- Turrancilla williamsoni Petuch, 1987 (taxon inquirendum)
