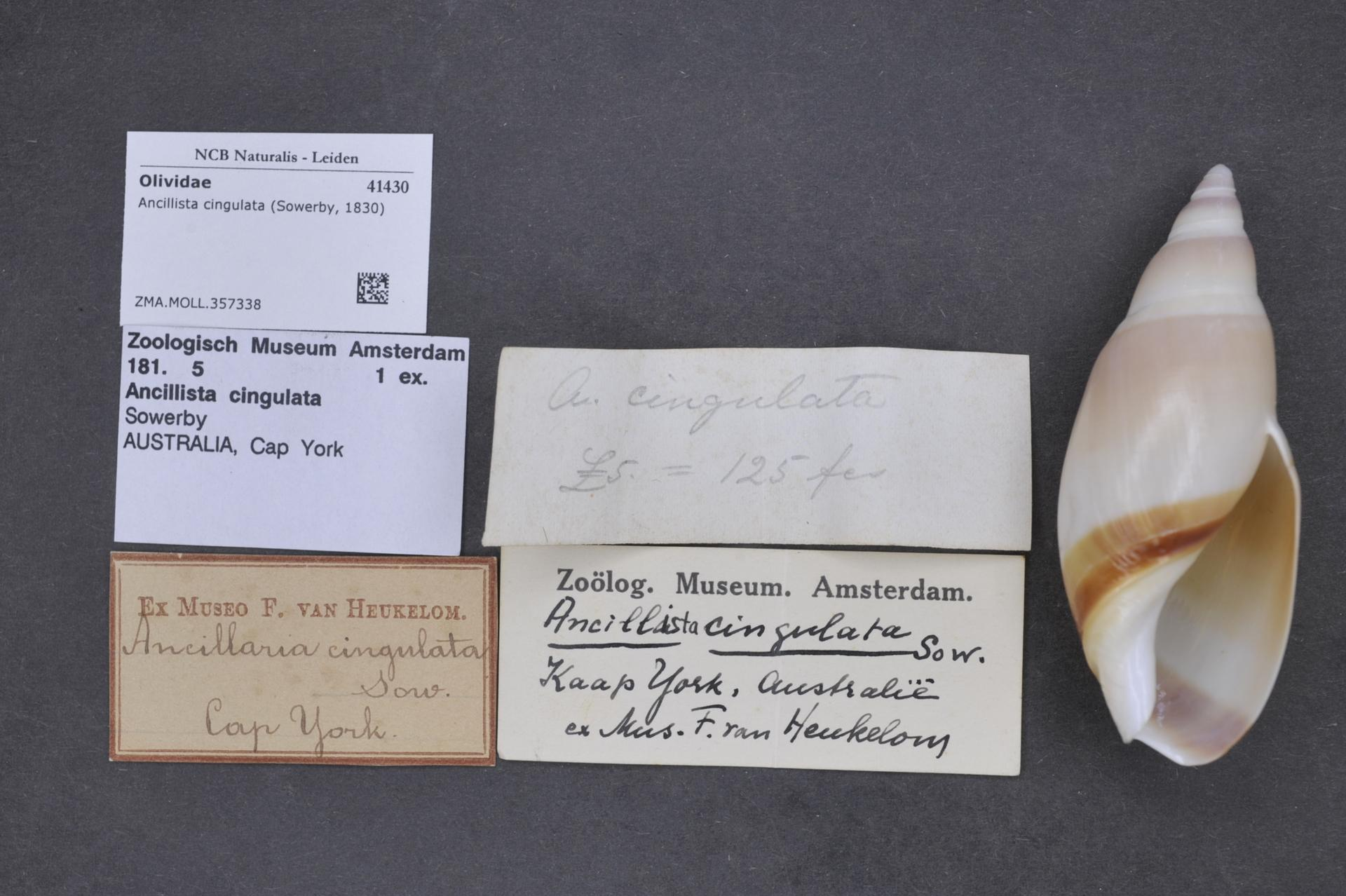

Scientific classification
- Kingdom: Animalia
- Phylum: Mollusca
- Class: Gastropoda
- Subclass: Caenogastropoda
- Order: Neogastropoda
- Family: Ancillariidae
- Genus: Ancillista; Iredale, 1936

Type species
- Ancillista velesiana Iredale, 1936

= Ancillista =

Genus of gastropods

Ancillista is a genus of sea snails, marine gastropod mollusks in the family Ancillariidae.

== Species ==
Species within the genus Ancillista include:

- Ancillista albicans Lee & Wu, 1997
- Ancillista aureocallosa Kilburn & Jenner, 1977 (Kilburn & Jenner, 1977)
- Ancillista cingulata (G.B. Sowerby I, 1830)
- Ancillista depontesi Kilburn, 1998
- Ancillista fernandesi Kilburn & Jenner, 1977
- Ancillista hasta (von Martens, 1902)
- Ancillista inhacaensis T. Cossignani & Rosado, 2022
- Ancillista muscae (Pilsbry, 1926)
- Ancillista ngampitchae Gra-Tes, 2002
- Ancillista rosadoi Bozetti & Terzer, 2004
- Ancillista velesiana Iredale, 1936

Synonyms

- † Ancillista subampliata (Tate, 1889): synonym of † Amalda subampliata (Tate, 1889) (superseded combination)
- † Ancillista subgradata (Tate, 1889): synonym of † Amalda subgradata (Tate, 1889) (superseded combination)

== External sources ==
- Iredale, T. (1936). "Australian molluscan notes, no. 2". Records of the Australian Museum. 19 (5).
