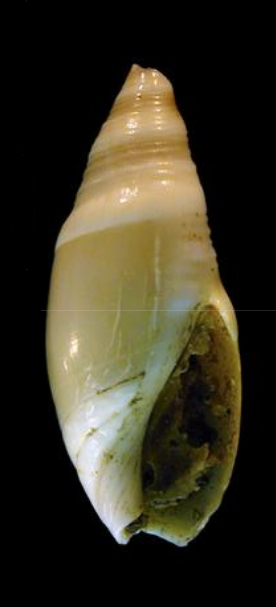
- Shell of Amalda petterdi (holotype at the Australian Museum)

Scientific classification
- Kingdom: Animalia
- Phylum: Mollusca
- Class: Gastropoda
- Subclass: Caenogastropoda
- Order: Neogastropoda
- Family: Ancillariidae
- Genus: Amalda
- Species: A. petterdi

Binomial name
- Amalda petterdi (Tate, 1893)

Synonyms
- Alocospira fusiformis (Petterd, 1886) (invalid: not J. Sowerby, 1850); Amalda fusiformis (Petterd, 1886) (invalid: not J. Sowerby, 1850); Amalda fusiformis fusiformis (Petterd, 1886) (invalid: not J. Sowerby, 1850); Amalda fusiformis gaza (Iredale, 1924) junior subjective synonym; Amalda lanceolata Ninomiya, 1991; Ancillaria fusiformis Petterd, 1886 (invalid; not J. Sowerby, 1850); Ancillaria obtusa Petterd, 1886 junior homonym (not Ancillaria obtusa Swainson, 1825;...); Ancillaria petterdi Tate, 1893 (superseded combination); Baryspira fusiformis (Petterd, 1886) (invalid: not J. Sowerby, 1850); Baryspira fusiformis gaza Iredale, 1924 junior subjective synonym

= Amalda petterdi =

Species of gastropod

Amalda petterdi is a species of sea snail, a marine gastropod mollusk in the family Ancillariidae.

== Description ==
(Original description as Ancillaria obtusa) The shell is ovate, thick, and glossy, ranging in color from white to pale fulvous. It has approximately five whorls, with a short, rounded spire lined and covered by a thick callous deposit. The apex is blunt and obtuse. The body whorl is bordered by broad, milky zones at both the upper and lower edges and displays linear markings at the base.

The columella is coated with a thick layer of enamel that extends onto the body whorl and appears slightly wrinkled and twisted near the siphonal canal. The outer lip is thin and sharp.

== Distribution ==
This marine species is endemic to Australia and occurs off New South Wales, South Australia, Tasmania and Victoria.
