= Ancillina =

Ancillina Temporal range: Paleocene–Recent

Scientific classification
- Kingdom: Animalia
- Phylum: Mollusca
- Class: Gastropoda
- Subclass: Caenogastropoda
- Order: Neogastropoda
- Family: Ancillariidae
- Genus: Ancillina; Bellardi, 1882

Type species
- † Ancillaria papillata Tate, 1889

Synonyms
- Ancilla (Ancillina) Bellardi, 1882 ·; Gracilancilla Thiele, 1925

Genus of gastropods

Ancillina is a genus of sea snails, marine gastropod mollusks in the family Ancillariidae.

== Description ==
(Original description in French) The shell is very small and narrow, tapering to a point. Its spire is slightly elongated with a conical curve, especially at the apex, and is covered by a glossy callus.

The protoconch is slightly stepped, with a small, prominent nucleus. The whorls grow quickly, and their sutures are barely visible beneath the glaze. The body whorl is very large, ovoid-conical, and rounded at its base. It has an unglazed area that covers about half of its height. A fine groove separates this area from the base, which is thick and divided into two very different-sized sections.

The aperture is very short, oval, and slightly angular, with no posterior groove. It widens at the front and ends abruptly with a shallow basal notch. The outer lip is thin and straight, barely curving back at the suture.

The columella is slightly curved inward and is twisted very obliquely at its front end. It has a narrow, flat fold that shows no signs of creasing. The columellar margin is quite wide and thick, particularly in the lower corner, where the thickness extends halfway up the second-to-body whorl.

== Species ==
Species within the genus Ancillina include:

- Ancillina apicalis (Kay, 1979)
- † Ancillina butonensis (Beets, 1942)
- † Ancillina iwaensis MacNeil, 1961
- † Ancillina kakano P. A. Maxwell, 1978
- Ancillina lindae (Petuch, 1987)
- † Ancillina pusilla (T. Fuchs, 1877)
- Ancillina sumatrana (Thiele, 1925)
- † Ancillina wellmani P. A. Maxwell, 1978
