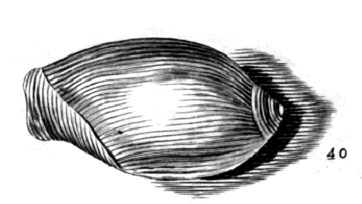
- Anolacia aperta

Scientific classification
- Kingdom: Animalia
- Phylum: Mollusca
- Class: Gastropoda
- Subclass: Caenogastropoda
- Order: Neogastropoda
- Family: Ancillariidae
- Genus: Anolacia; Gray, 1857

Type species
- Ancilla mauritiana (G. B. Sowerby I, 1830)

Synonyms
- Ancillaria (Cymbancilla) P. Fischer, 1881; Anolacea (misspelling)

= Anolacia =

Genus of gastropods

Anolacia is a genus of sea snails, marine gastropod mollusks in the family Ancillariidae.

== Description ==
(Original description) The shell is oblong, thin and concentrically grooved. It has a short spire, and the outer lip is thin and smooth, without any denticles. The aperture is large, and the shell's axis is imperforate, meaning it doesn't have an umbilical opening. The shell lacks any enamel coating. The animal has no operculum and a very large foot.

== Species ==
Species within the genus Anolacia include:

- Anolacia aperta (G.B. Sowerby I, 1825)
- Anolacia bozzettii Prati, 1995
- Anolacia lorenzi T. Cossignani, 2022
- Anolacia mauritiana (G.B. Sowerby I, 1830)
