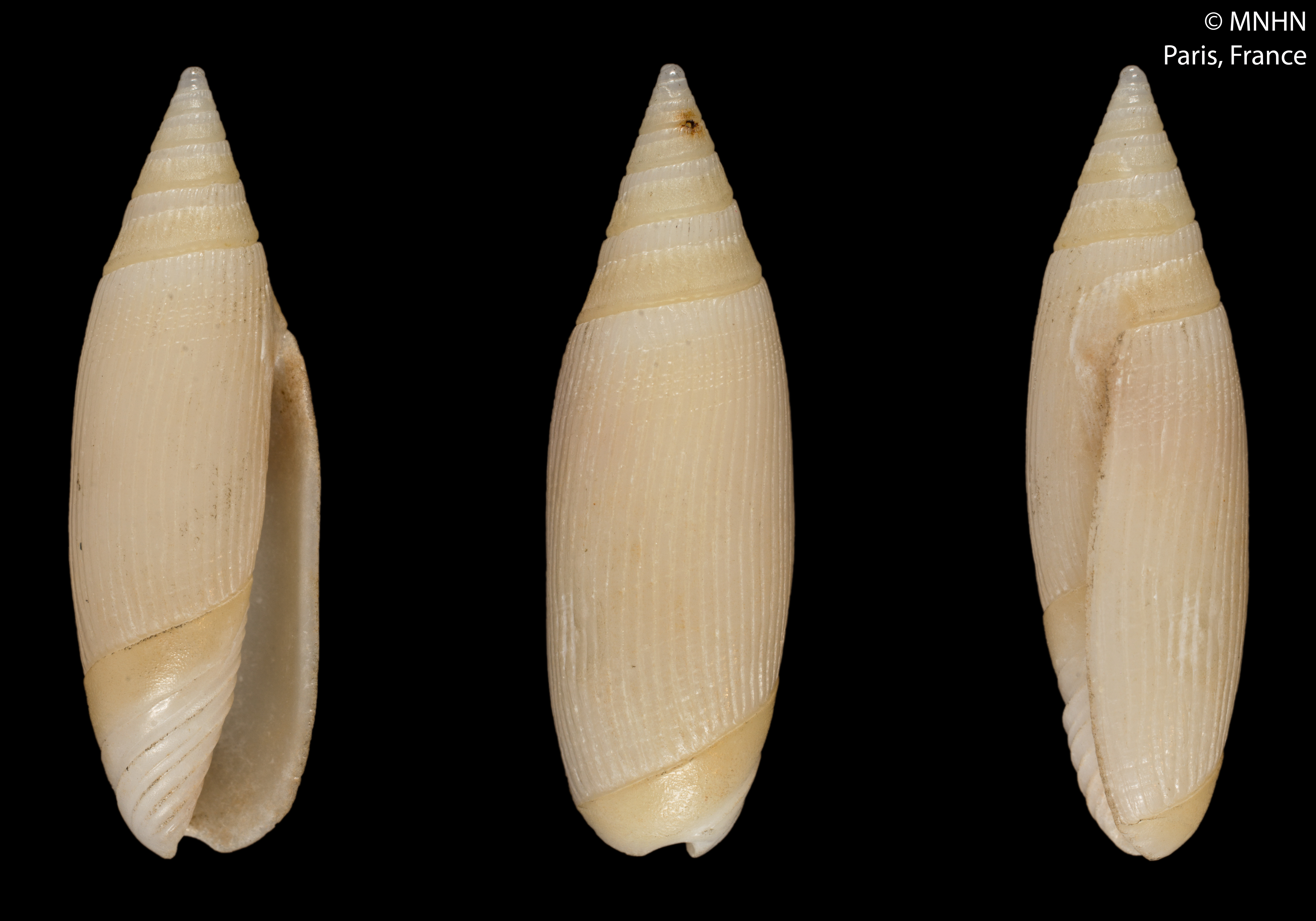
- Entomoliva mirabilis

Scientific classification
- Kingdom: Animalia
- Phylum: Mollusca
- Class: Gastropoda
- Subclass: Caenogastropoda
- Order: Neogastropoda
- Superfamily: Olivoidea
- Family: Ancillariidae
- Genus: Entomoliva; Bouchet & Kilburn, 1991

Type species
- Entomoliva incisa Bouchet & Kilburn, 1991

= Entomoliva =

Genus of gastropods

Entomoliva is a genus of sea snails, marine gastropod mollusks in the family Ancillariidae.

== Species ==
Species within the genus Entomoliva include:

- Entomoliva incisa Bouchet & Kilburn, 1991
- Entomoliva mirabilis Bouchet & Kilburn, 1991
