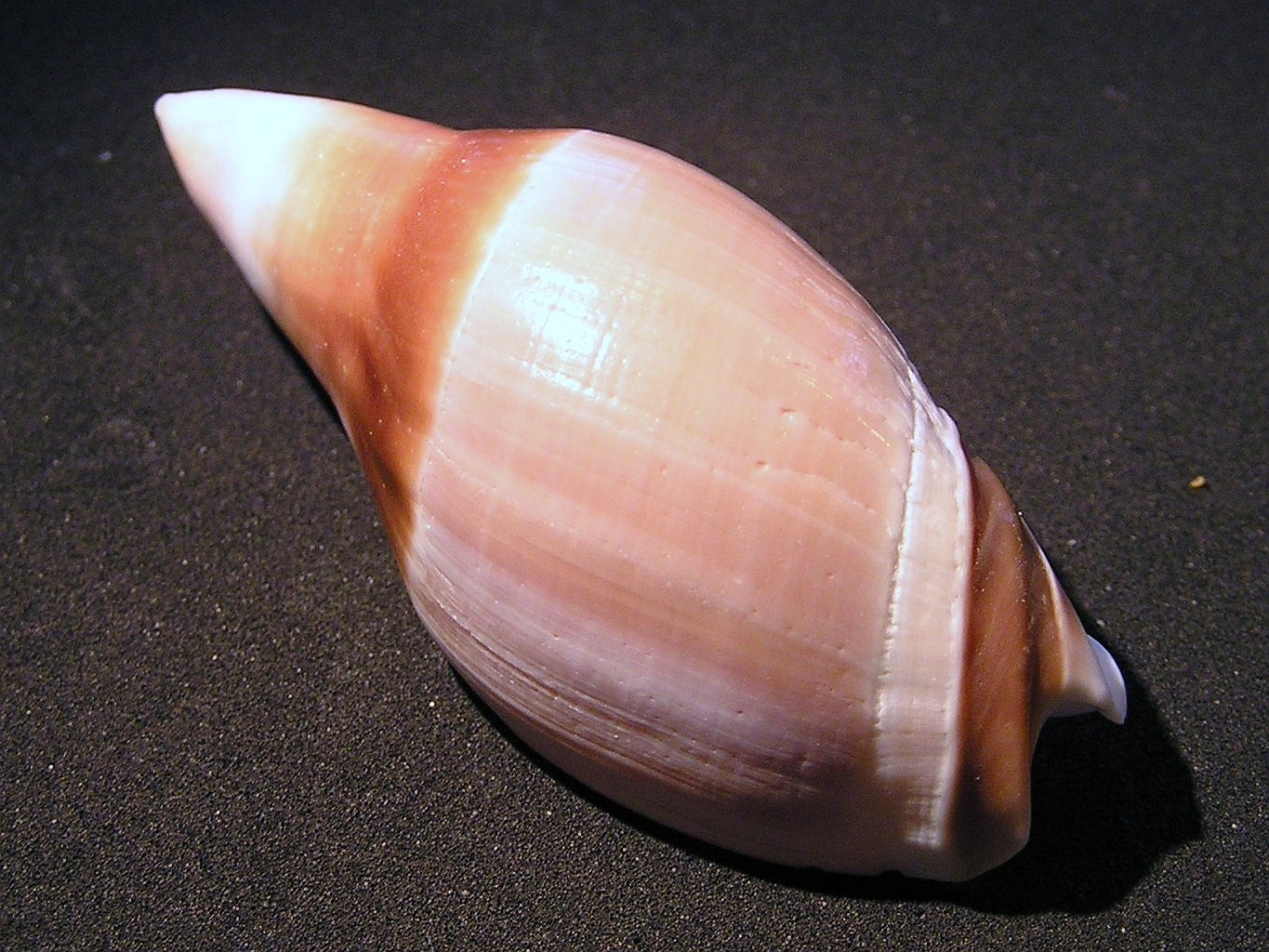

Scientific classification
- Kingdom: Animalia
- Phylum: Mollusca
- Class: Gastropoda
- Subclass: Caenogastropoda
- Order: Neogastropoda
- Family: Ancillariidae
- Genus: Amalda
- Species: A. rubiginosa

Binomial name
- Amalda rubiginosa (Swainson, 1823)

Synonyms
- Ancilla rubiginosa Swainson, 1823 (original combination); Ancillaria rubiginosa Swainson, 1825 (objective synonym); Amalda hayashi Ninomiya, 1988

= Amalda rubiginosa =

Species of gastropod

Amalda rubiginosa is a species of sea snail, a marine gastropod mollusk in the family Ancillariidae.

== Subspecies ==
- Amalda rubiginosa albocallosa (Lischke, C.E., 1873)
- Amalda rubiginosa rubiginosa (Swainson, W.A., 1823)

== Description ==
(Original description) The shell is oblong, with an elongated and acuminated spire that can vary somewhat in proportion relative to the aperture. Its general color is chestnut-brown, with the spire being a darker, more rusty shade. The upper part of the body whorl displays a whitish belt, partially obscured by a rusty-colored callosity that extends over the spire.

A prominent, impressed line near the lower part of the body whorl forms a short, projecting tooth at the lower edge of the outer lip. While several species have a similar impressed line, this one is unusually distant from the lower belts. Below this line are two additional belts, the upper of which is bisected by a raised line. A deep groove marks the area above the columellar varix, with an additional shallow groove on the left side of the varix itself, which is whitish and only faintly grooved otherwise.

The upper part of the aperture is somewhat rounded, with the interior being slightly paler than the shell’s exterior. The columellar lip is whitish with a rose-colored tint. The dwarf variety of this shell exhibits a beautiful lilac tint across the inner aperture, inner lip, and part of the spire.

== Distribution ==
This marine species occurs off Vietnam, China, Taiwan and Japan.
