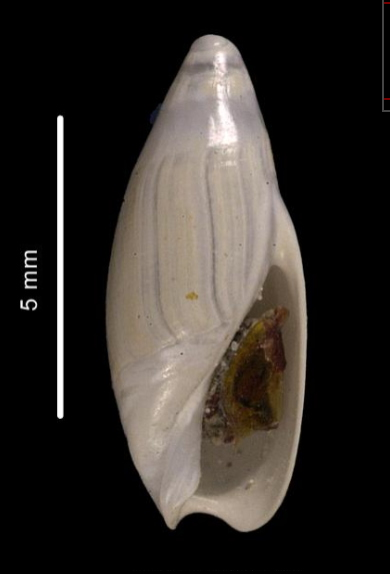
- Shell of Micrancilla longispira (specimen at the Smithsonian Institution)

Scientific classification
- Kingdom: Animalia
- Phylum: Mollusca
- Class: Gastropoda
- Subclass: Caenogastropoda
- Order: Neogastropoda
- Superfamily: Olivoidea
- Family: Ancillariidae; Swainson, 1840

Genera
- See text

Synonyms
- Ancillariinae Swainson, 1840; Ancillinae H. Adams & A. Adams, 1853; Dipsaccinae P. Fischer, 1884; † Vanpalmeriinae Adegoke, 1977

= Ancillariidae =

Family of gastropods

The Ancillariidae is a taxonomic family of sea snails, marine gastropod molluscs in the superfamily Olivoidea. They are gastropods, which belong to the larger group of mollusks. This family is part of the superfamily Cypraeoidea, which includes cowries, a well-known group of sea snails.

== Distribution and habitat ==
Ancillariidae species can be found in tropical and subtropical waters around the world, particularly in the Indo-Pacific region. They inhabit diverse marine environments, including coral reefs, sandy bottoms, and seagrass beds.

== Physical characteristics ==
Ancillariidae shells are elongated, cylindrical, and slightly curved. They have a smooth and glossy surface, with some species displaying prominent ridges or knobs. The shells exhibit a wide range of colors and patterns, from plain white or cream to vibrant and intricate designs.

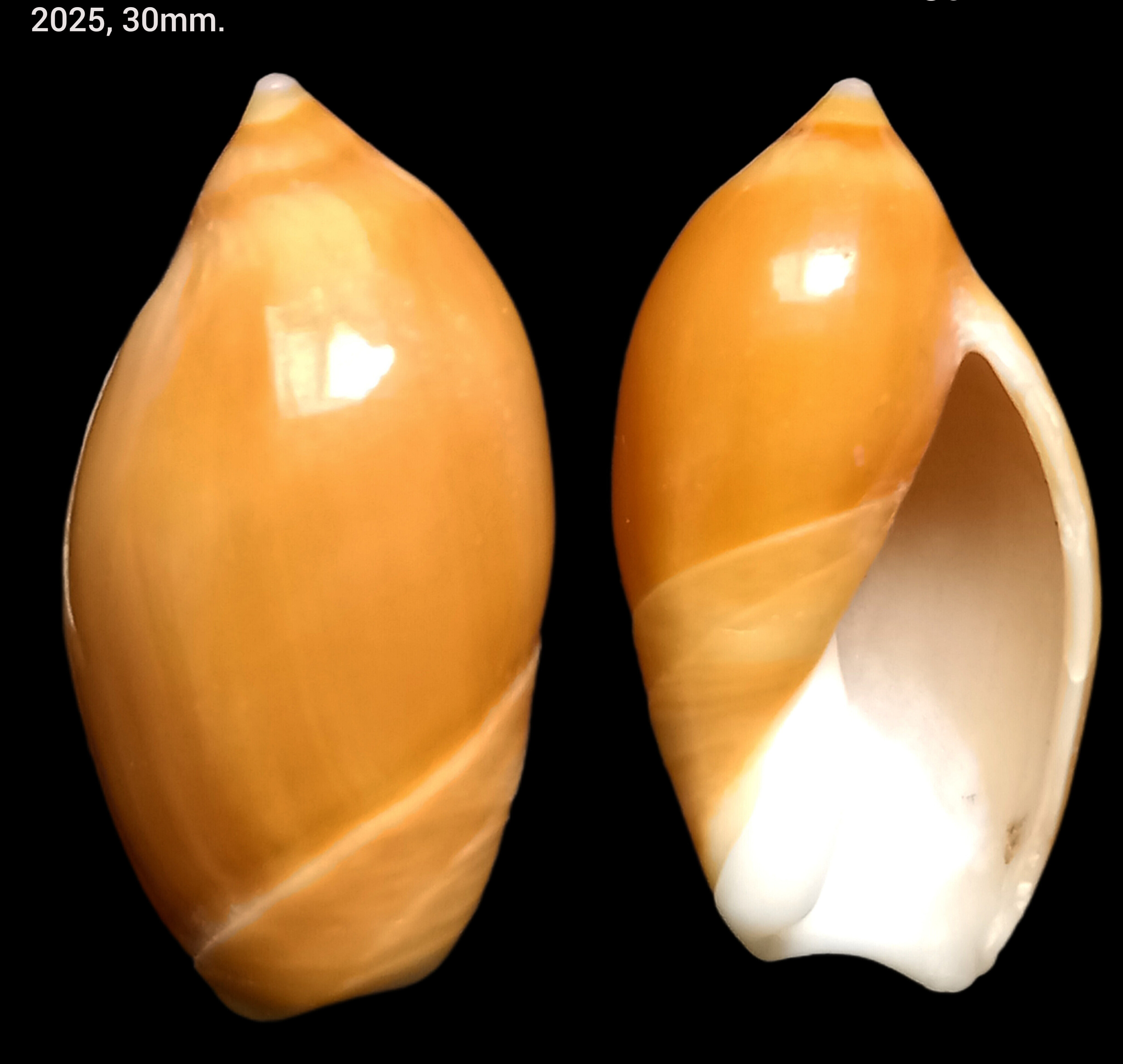
Ancilla acuminata

== Behavior and feeding habits ==
Ancillariidae snails are primarily nocturnal, being active at night to feed on algae, detritus, and small invertebrates. They use their specialized radula to scrape food particles from the substrate or graze on algae. During the day, they seek shelter in crevices or burrow in the sand to avoid predators and excessive sunlight.

== Reproduction ==
Reproduction in Ancillariidae involves separate sexes, with individuals being either male or female. They release eggs and sperm into the water, where fertilization takes place externally. The larvae develop into planktonic forms, drifting in ocean currents until they settle on the substrate and undergo metamorphosis into adults.

== Genera ==
Genera within the family Ancillariidae include:

- Alocospira Cossmann, 1899
- Amalda H. Adams & A. Adams, 1853
- † Anbullina K. van W. Palmer, 1937
- Ancilla Lamarck, 1799
- † Ancillarina Bellardi, 1882
- Ancillina Bellardi, 1882
- Ancillista Iredale, 1936
- † Ancillopsis Conrad, 1865
- Anolacia Gray, 1857
- † Bearizia Pacaud, Merle & Pons, 2013
- Eburna Lamarck, 1801
- Entomoliva Bouchet & Kilburn, 1991
- † Eoancilla Stephenson, 1941
- Micrancilla Maxwell, 1992
- † Monoptygma I. Lea, 1833
- † Olivula Conrad, 1832
- † Palmoliva Allmon & Friend, 2023
- † Spirancilla H. E. Vokes, 1935
- Turrancilla Martens, 1903

Genera brought into synonymy

- Anaulax Roissy, 1805: synonym of Ancilla Lamarck, 1799 (unnecessary substitute name for Ancilla)
- Ancillaria Lamarck, 1811: synonym of Ancilla Lamarck, 1799 (unnecessary substitute name for Ancilla Lamarck, 1799)
- Ancillus Montfort, 1810: synonym of AncillaLamarck, 1799 (invalid: unjustified emendation of Ancilla)
- Anolacea: synonym of Anolacia Gray, 1857 (misspelling)
- Austrancilla Habe, 1959: synonym of Amalda H. Adams & A. Adams, 1853
- Baryspira P. Fischer, 1883: synonym of Amalda (Baryspira) P. Fischer, 1883 represented as Amalda H. Adams & A. Adams, 1853
- Chilotygma H. Adams & A. Adams, 1853: synonym of Ancilla (Chilotygma) H. Adams & A. Adams, 1853 represented as Ancilla Lamarck, 1799
- Dipsaccus H. Adams & A. Adams, 1853: synonym of Eburna Lamarck, 1801
- Exiquaspira Ninomiya, 1988: synonym of Amalda H. Adams & A. Adams, 1853
- Gracilancilla Thiele, 1925: synonym of Ancillina Bellardi, 1882
- Gracilispira Olsson, 1956: synonym of Amalda (Gracilispira) Olsson, 1956 represented as Amalda H. Adams & A. Adams, 1853
- Sandella Gray, 1857: synonym of Amalda H. Adams & A. Adams, 1853
- Sparella Gray, 1857: synonym of Ancilla (Sparella) Gray, 1857 represented as Ancilla Lamarck, 1799 (original rank)
