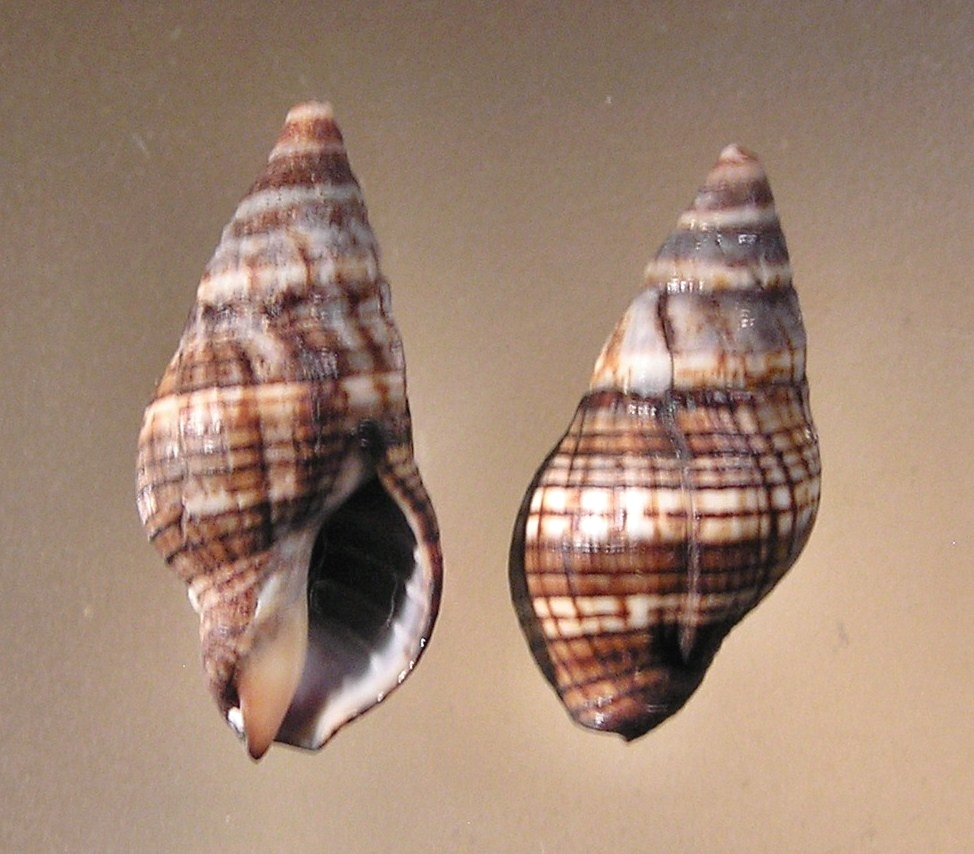
- Euthria cingulata
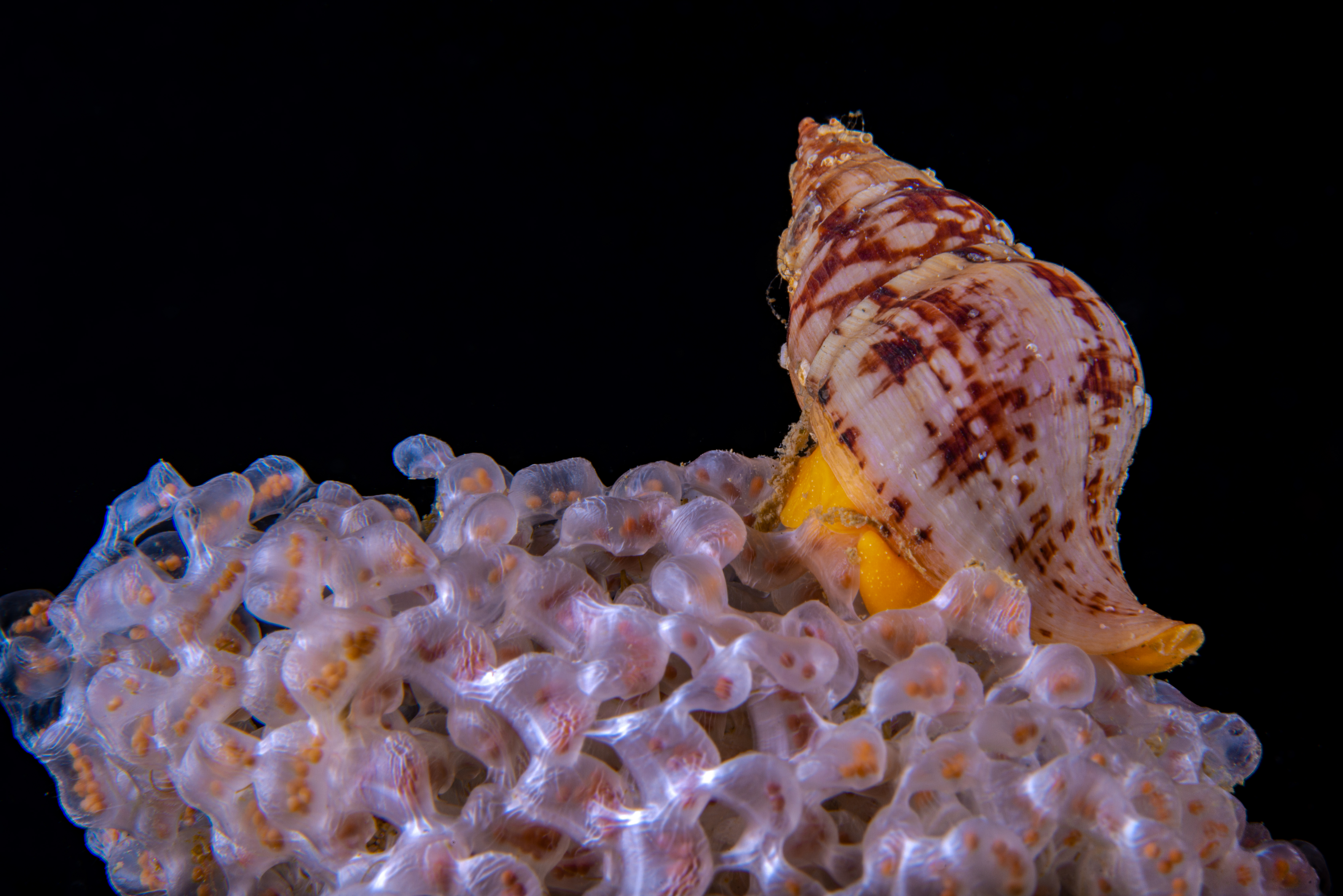
- Euthria cornea laying eggs

Scientific classification
- Kingdom: Animalia
- Phylum: Mollusca
- Class: Gastropoda
- Subclass: Caenogastropoda
- Order: Neogastropoda
- Superfamily: Buccinoidea
- Family: Tudiclidae
- Genus: Euthria; Gray, 1850

Type species
- Murex corneus Linnaeus, 1758

Synonyms
- Fusus (Euthria) Gray, 1850; Siphonofusus Kuroda & Habe, 1954

= Euthria =

Genus of gastropods

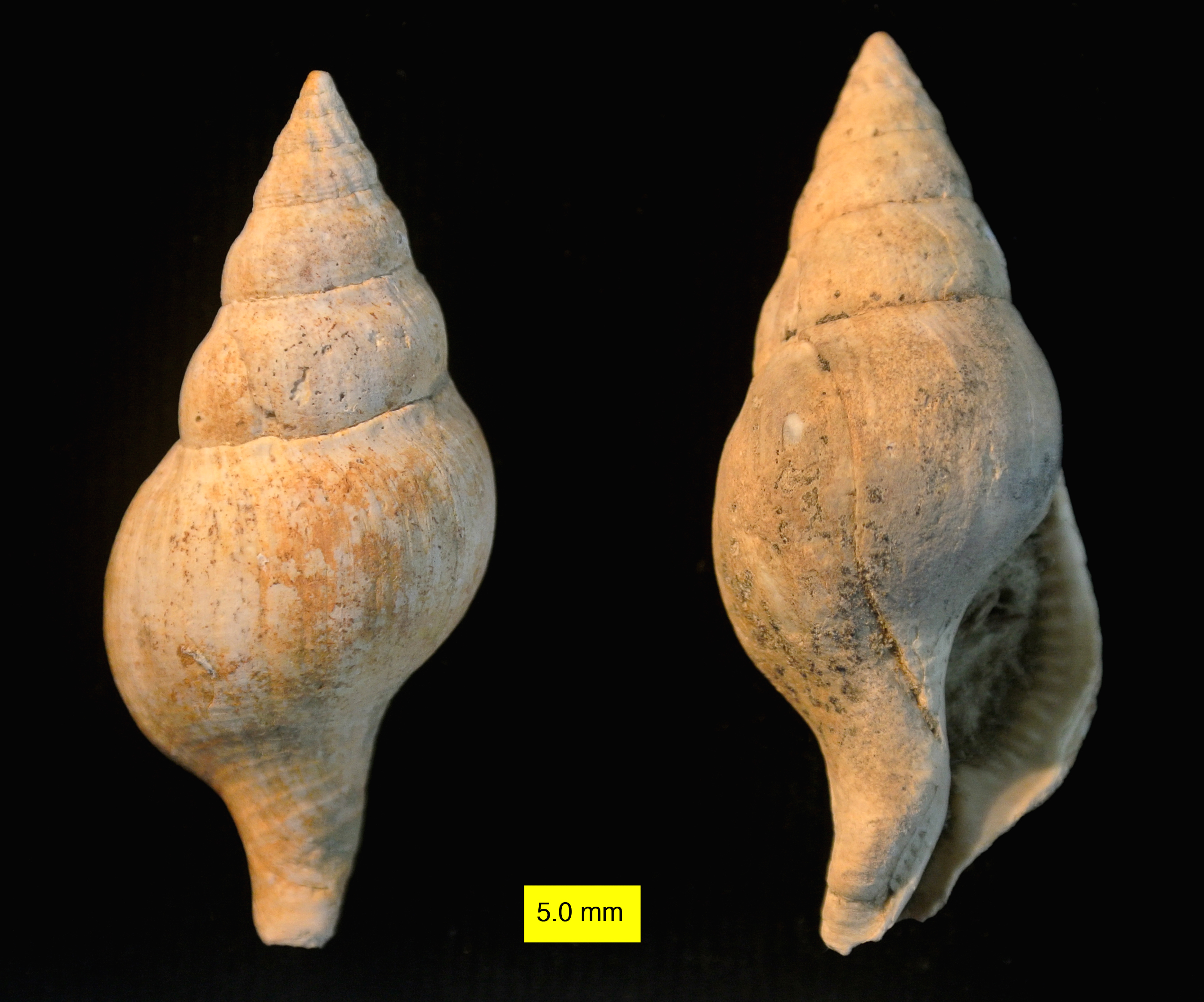
Fossil Euthria from the Pliocene of Cyprus.

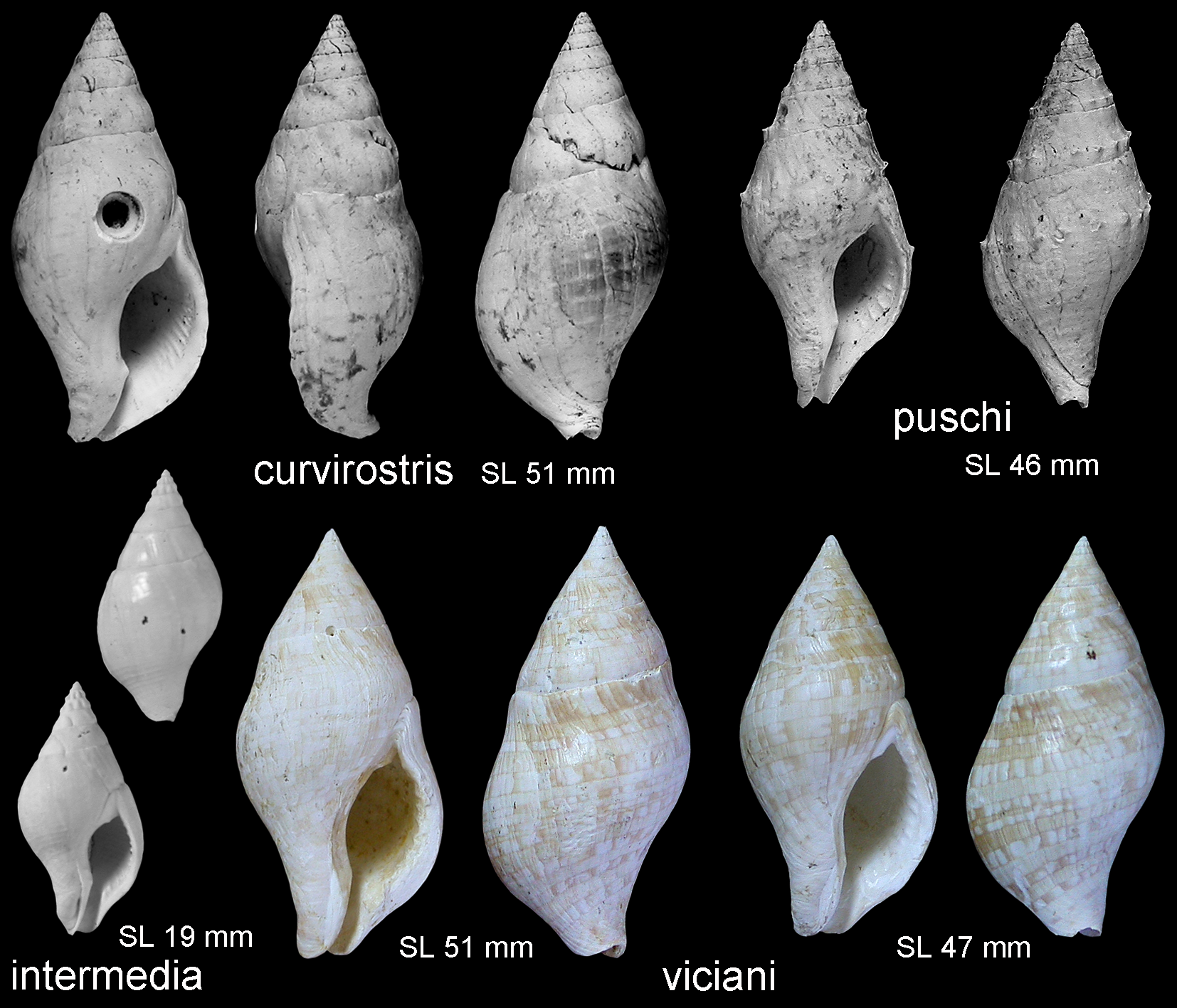
Middle Miocene Euthria species from the Pannonian Basin (Central Paratethys)

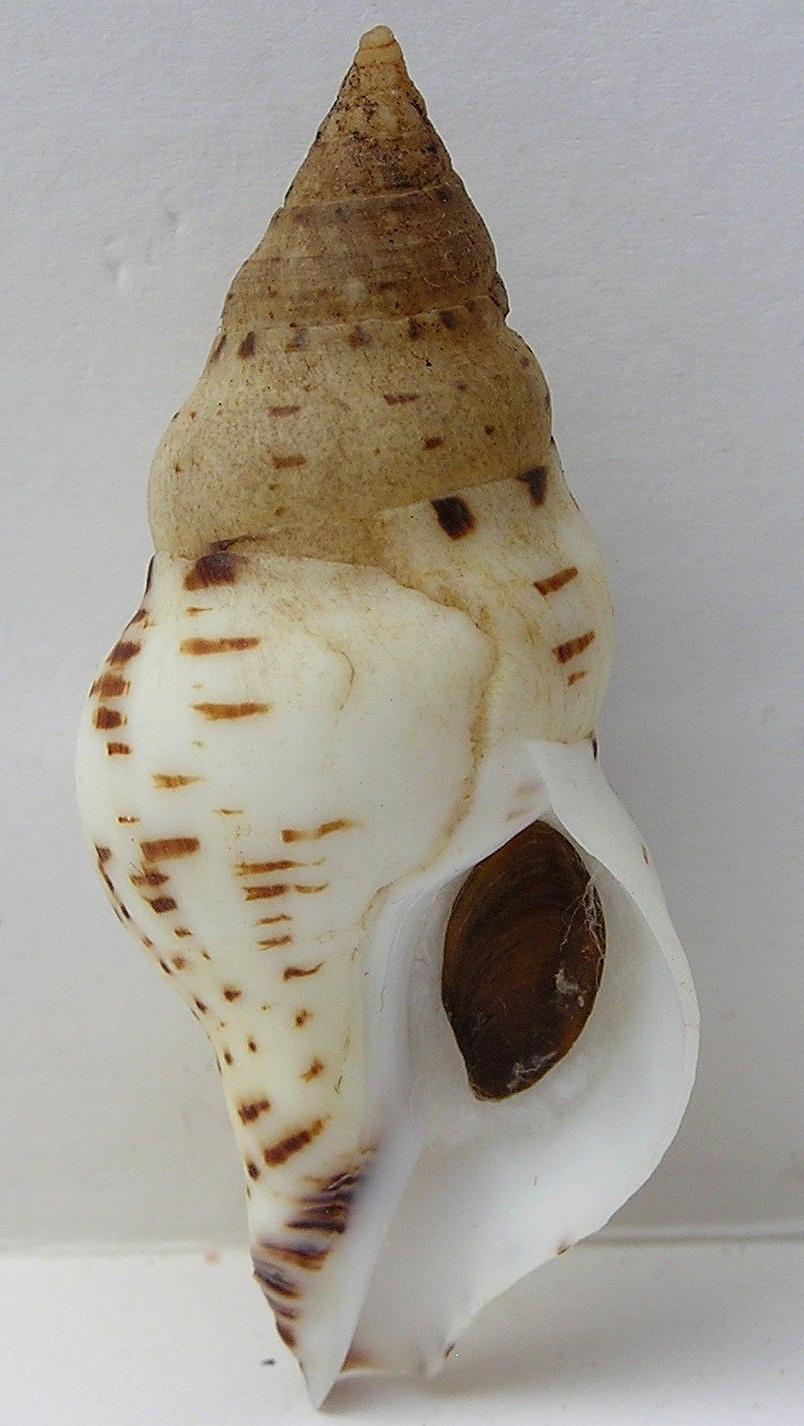
Euthria calypso

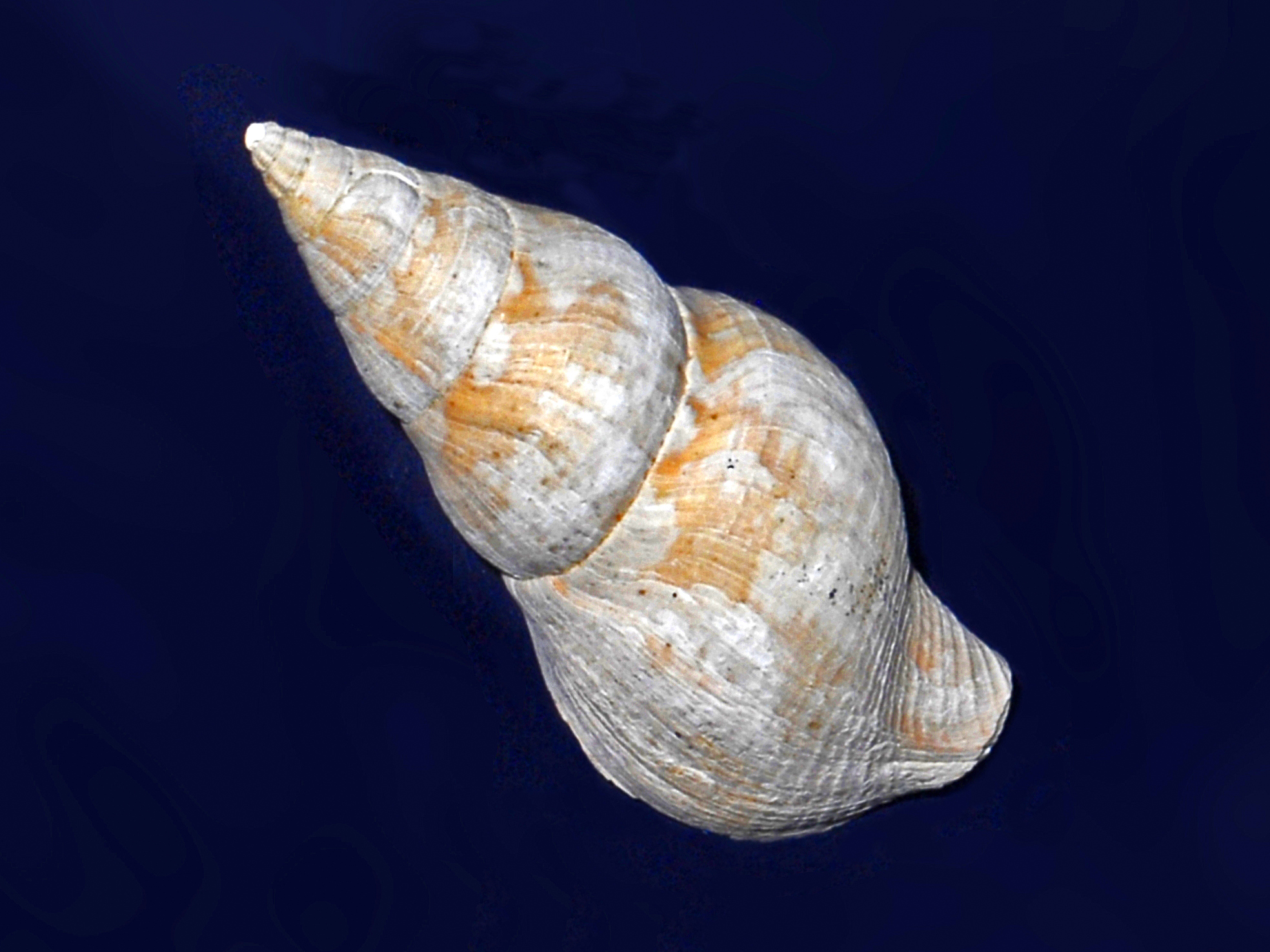
Fossil shell of Euthria cornea from the Pliocene epoch of Italy

Euthria is a genus of sea snails belonging to the whelk family Tudiclidae. The genus contains many fossil and extant species.

== Distribution ==
The range of Euthria ranges from the Mediterranean Sea, the eastern Atlantic, regions around southern Africa and the western Indo-Pacific. Euthria erythraea is the first recorded of this genus from the Red Sea. This genus shows a highs degree of endemism with an example being seen in the Canary Islands archipelago where Euthria sophiae, Euthria macarroni, Euthria candoris and Euthria silviae can be found.

== Evolutionary history ==
The fossil record of this genus starts from the Eocene epoch and it continues to the modern day. During the Oligocene epoch and Neogene period, this genus har experienced a significant expansion of range from the Atlanto-Mediterranean region and the Paratethys seas.

== Species ==
Species within the genus Euthria include:

- Euthria abrotona Fraussen & Rolán, 2003
- Euthria adeles Dautzenberg & Fisher, 1906
- † Euthria adunca (Bronn, 1831)
- Euthria amorimi Fraussen, 2004
- Euthria annegretae Schoenherr & Rolán, 2017
- Euthria aracanense Angas, 1873
- Euthria bernardi Rolán, Monteiro & Fraussen, 2003
- Euthria boavistensis Cosel, 1982
- Euthria calderoni Rolán, 1985
- Euthria calypso Cosel & Burnay, 1983
- † Euthria ceddensis Brunetti & Della Bella, 2016
- Euthria cesari Monteiro & Rolan, 2005
- Euthria chinense (MacNeil, 1961)
- Euthria cornea (Linnaeus, 1758)
- Euthria cumulata Fraussen & Hadorn, 2003
- † Euthria curvirostris (Grateloup, 1845)
- Euthria darwini Monteiro & Rolan, 2005
- Euthria effendyi Fraussen & Dharma, 2002
- Euthria emilioi Fraussen & Afonso, 2011
- Euthria erythraea Fraussen & Stahlschmidt, 2020
- Euthria fernandesi Rolán, Monteiro & Fraussen, 2003
- Euthria fiadeiroi Fraussen & Swinnen, 2020
- † Euthria friedbergi Baluk, 1995
- † Euthria fuscocingulata (Hoernes & Auinger, 1890)
- Euthria galopimi
- Euthria helenae Rolán, Monteiro & Fraussen, 2003
- Euthria inesae Fraussen, Monteiro & Swinnen, 2012
- Euthria insulabris Fraussen & Rolan, 2003
- † Euthria intermedia Michelotti, 1839
- Euthria japonica (Shuto, 1978)
- Euthria javanica Fraussen & Dekker, 2002
- † Euthria lanotensis Lozouet, 1999
- Euthria galopimi
- Euthria lockleyi (Dall, 1918)
- Euthria marianae Rolán, Monteiro & Fraussen, 2003
- † Euthria mellianensis Lozouet, 2021
- † Euthria minor Bellardi, 1872
- Euthria noligomesi Rolan & Monteiro, 2007
- † Euthria pangoides (Beu, 1973)
- † Euthria perpiniana Fontannes, 1879
- Euthria philpoppei Fraussen, 2002
- Euthria placibilis Fraussen, Monteiro & Swinnen, 2012
- † Euthria plioelongata Sacco, 1890
- Euthria poppei Fraussen, 1999
- Euthria pulicaria Dautzenberg & Fisher, 1906
- † Euthria puschi Andrzejowski, 1830
- Euthria rolani Cosel, 1982
- Euthria scepta Fraussen & Hadorn, 2003
- Euthria solifer Fraussen & Hadorn, 2003
- Euthria somalica (Parth, 1999)
- Euthria soniae Rolán, Monteiro & Fraussen, 2003
- Euthria taeniopsoides Fraussen & Afonso, 2008
- † Euthria tarusatensis Lozouet, 2021
- Euthria vandae Rolan & Monteiro, 2007
- † Euthria viciani Kovács, 2018
- Euthria vokesi Fraussen & Garcia, 2008
- Euthria walleri (Ladd, 1976)

Species brought into synonymy

- Euthria aracanense [sic] : synonym of Euthria aracanensis Angas, 1873
- Euthria aucklandica E.A. Smith, 1902: synonym of Xymene aucklandicus (E.A. Smith, 1902)
- Euthria candidata Mabille & Rochebrune: synonym of Pareuthria atrata (E. A. Smith, 1881)
- Euthria cecilea Fraussen & Rolán, 2003: synonym of Euthria marianae Rolán, Monteiro & Fraussen, 2003
- Euthria chlorotica (Martens, 1878): synonym of Pareuthria chlorotica (Martens, 1878)
- Euthria cingulata Reeve L.A., 1847: synonym of Japeuthria cingulata (Reeve, 1846)
- Euthria clathratula Thiele, 1925: synonym of Meteuthria clathratula (Thiele, 1925)
- Euthria eburnea G.B. Sowerby III, 1900 : synonym of Peristernia forskalii leucothea Melvill, 1891
- Euthria fallax Thiele, 1925: synonym of Meteuthria fallax (Thiele, 1925)
- Euthria filmerae G.B. Sowerby III, 1900: synonym of Latirus filmerae (G.B. Sowerby III, 1900)
- Euthria formosa Thiele, 1925: synonym of Meteuthria formosa (Thiele, 1925)
- Euthria fuscata Bruguiere: synonym of Pareuthria fuscata
- Euthria fuscotincta G.B. Sowerby III, 1886: synonym of Peristernia fuscotincta (G.B. Sowerby III, 1886)
- Euthria josepedroi Rolan & Monteiro, 2007: synonym of Euthria vandae Rolán & Monteiro, 2007
- Euthria lacertina Gould, 1860: synonym of Afrocominella capensis capensis (Dunker in Philippi, 1844)
- Euthria multistriata Turton, 1932: synonym of Afrocominella capensis simoniana (Petit de la Saussaye, 1852)
- Euthria ordinaria Turton, 1932: synonym of Peristernia fuscotincta (G.B. Sowerby III, 1886)
- Euthria ponsonbyi G.B. Sowerby, 1889: synonym of Buccinulum ponsonbyi (G.B. Sowerby III, 1889)
- Euthria pura Martens, 1903: synonym of Zemitrella pura (Martens, 1903)
- Euthria queketti E.A. Smith, 1901: synonym of Buccinulum queketti (E.A. Smith, 1901)
- Euthria rikae Fraussen, 2003: synonym of Fusolatirus rikae (Fraussen, 2003)
- Euthria rosea Hombron & Jacquinot, 1853: synonym of Pareuthria powelli
- Euthria saharica Locard, 1897: synonym of Euthriostoma saharicum (Locard, 1897)
- Euthria simoniana Petit, 1852: synonym of Afrocominella capensis simoniana (Petit de la Saussaye, 1852)
- Euthria suduirauti Fraussen, 2003: synonym of Fusolatirus suduirauti (Fraussen, 2003)
- Euthria turtoni Bartsch, 1915: synonym of Afrocominella turtoni (Bartsch, 1915)

Cladogram of Austrosiphonidae and Tudiclidae

- - - Antarctoneptunea
    - Kelletia
    - Penion
    - Serratifusus
- - Aeneator
  - Buccinulum
  - Euthria
  - Tasmeuthria
