= Euthria taeniopsoides =

Scientific classification
- Kingdom: Animalia
- Phylum: Mollusca
- Class: Gastropoda
- Subclass: Caenogastropoda
- Order: Neogastropoda
- Family: Tudiclidae
- Genus: Euthria
- Species: E. taeniopsoides

Binomial name
- Euthria taeniopsoides Fraussen & Afonso, 2008

Species of gastropod

Euthria taeniopsoides is a species of sea snail, a marine gastropod mollusc in the family Buccinidae, the true whelks.
