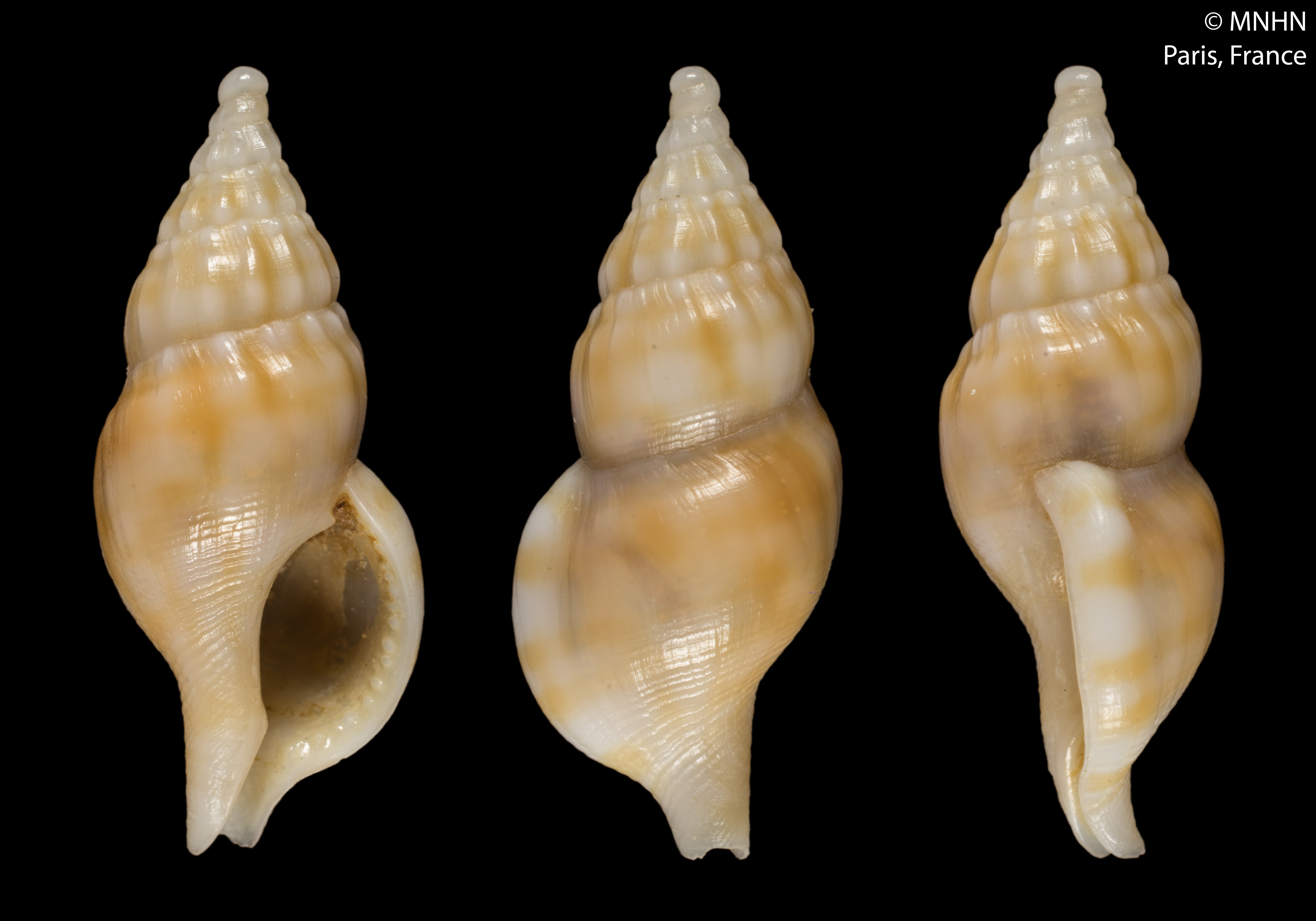
- Shell of Euthria philpoppei (holotype at MNHN, Paris)

Scientific classification
- Kingdom: Animalia
- Phylum: Mollusca
- Class: Gastropoda
- Subclass: Caenogastropoda
- Order: Neogastropoda
- Family: Tudiclidae
- Genus: Euthria
- Species: E. philpoppei

Binomial name
- Euthria philpoppei Fraussen, 2002

= Euthria philpoppei =

Species of gastropod

Euthria philpoppei is a species of sea snail, a marine gastropod mollusk in the family Buccinidae, the true whelks.

== Description ==
The length of the shell attains 22.8 mm, possibly up to 30 mm. The first teleoconch whorl can vary from white to off-white, with distinctive brownish-orange or/and spiral bands beginning from the second teleoconch whorl on and beyond. The axial ribs have white spots arranged in 2 bands on the upper teleoconch whorls or 3 bands from third teleoconch whorl onwards. The white spots turn larger and irregular nearer to lower whorls. The inflated protoconch is bulbous and glossy, with a smooth surface and whorls.

== Distribution ==
This marine species occurs off New Caledonia.
