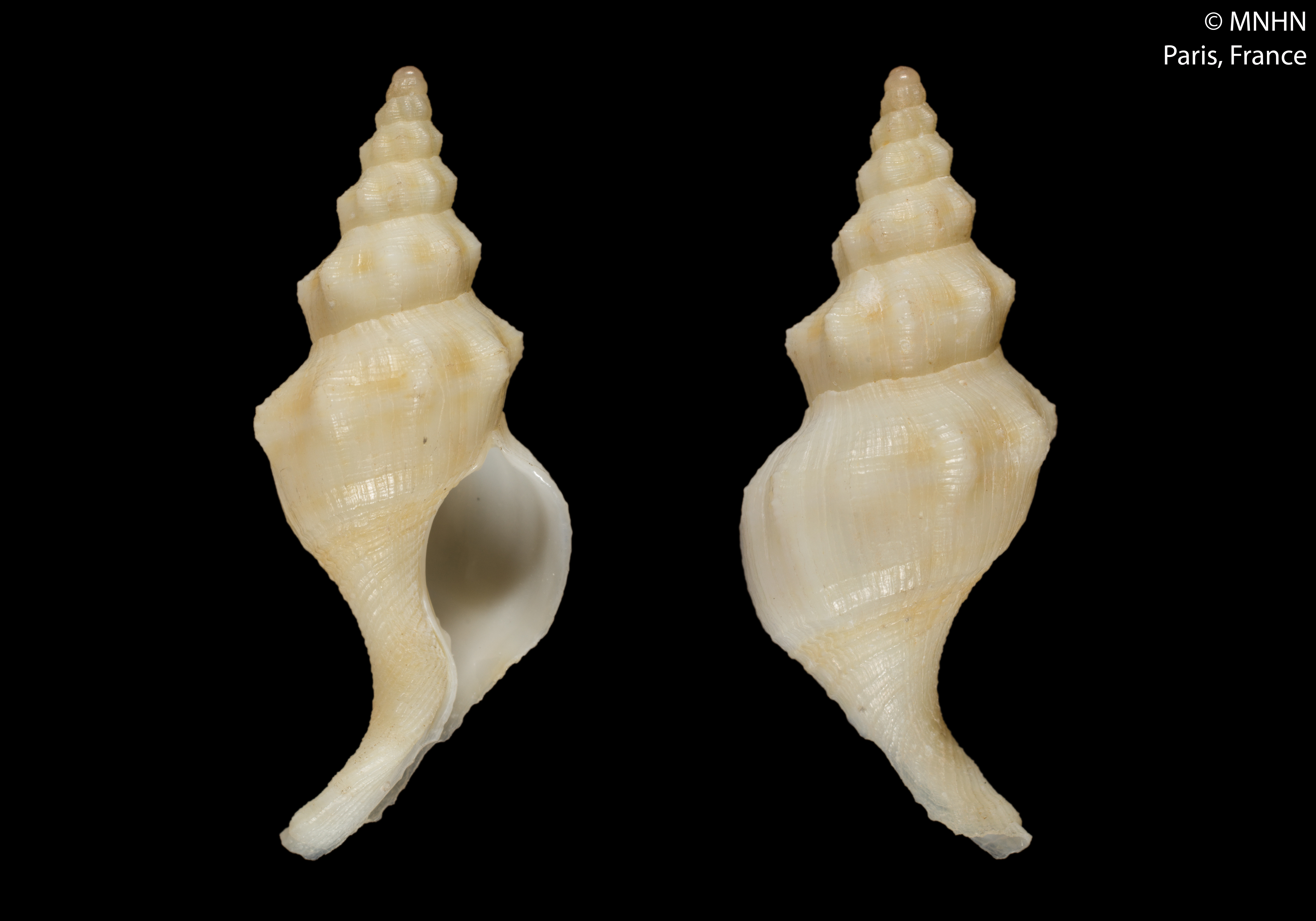
- Shell of Euthria cumulata (holotype at MNHN, Paris)

Scientific classification
- Kingdom: Animalia
- Phylum: Mollusca
- Class: Gastropoda
- Subclass: Caenogastropoda
- Order: Neogastropoda
- Family: Tudiclidae
- Genus: Euthria
- Species: E. cumulata

Binomial name
- Euthria cumulata Fraussen & Hadorn, 2003

= Euthria cumulata =

Species of gastropod

Euthria cumulata is a species of sea snail, a marine gastropod mollusk in the family Buccinidae, the true whelks.

== Description ==
The length of the shell attains 36.5 mm.

== Distribution ==
This marine species occurs off New Caledonia.
