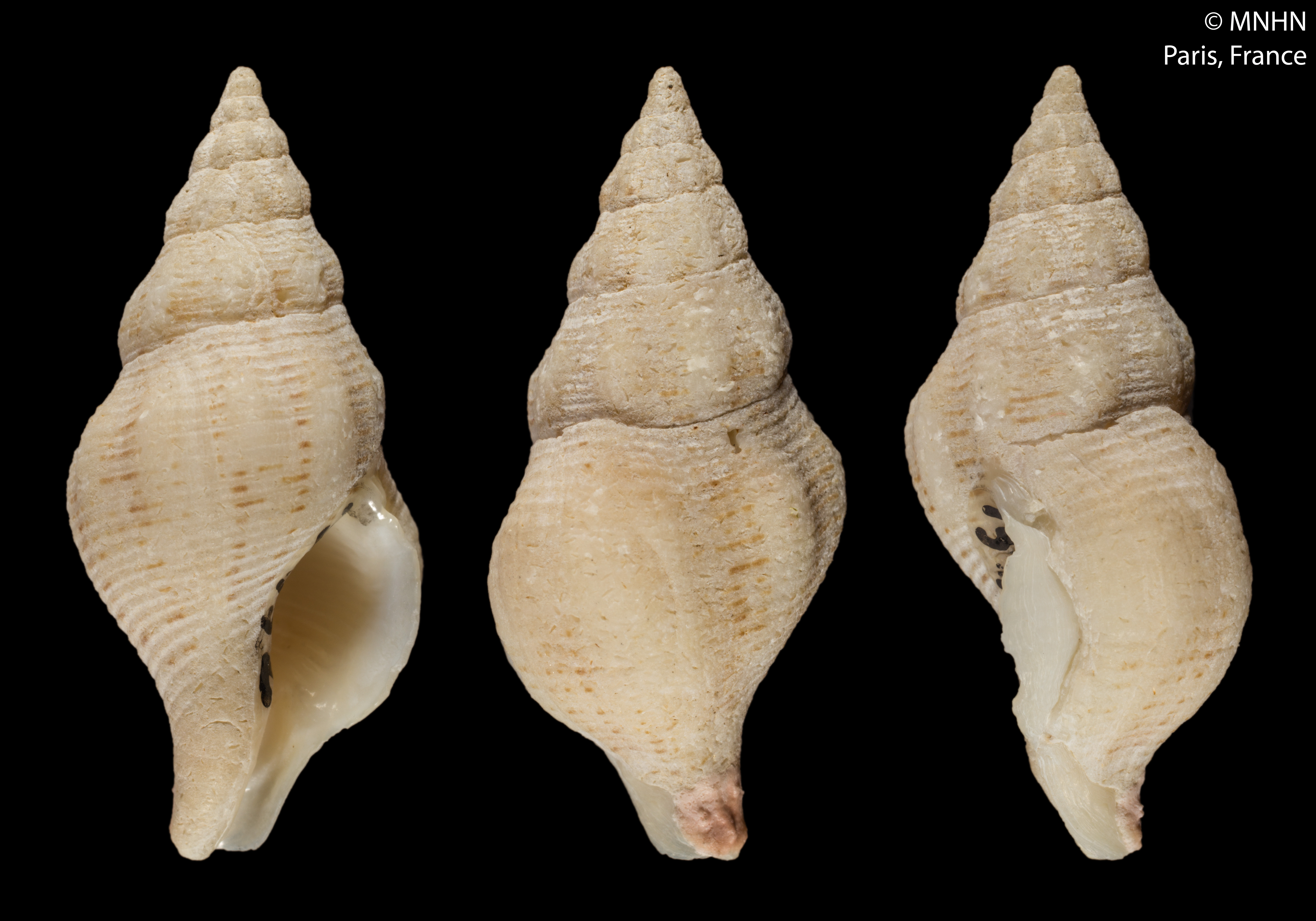
- Shell of Euthria vokesi (holotype at MNHN, Paris)

Scientific classification
- Kingdom: Animalia
- Phylum: Mollusca
- Class: Gastropoda
- Subclass: Caenogastropoda
- Order: Neogastropoda
- Family: Tudiclidae
- Genus: Euthria
- Species: E. vokesi

Binomial name
- Euthria vokesi Fraussen & Garcia, 2008

= Euthria vokesi =

Species of gastropod

Euthria vokesi is a species of sea snail, a marine gastropod mollusc in the family Buccinidae, the true whelks.

== Description ==
The length of the shell attains 31.7 mm.

== Distribution ==
This species occurs in the Indian Ocean off Somalia.
