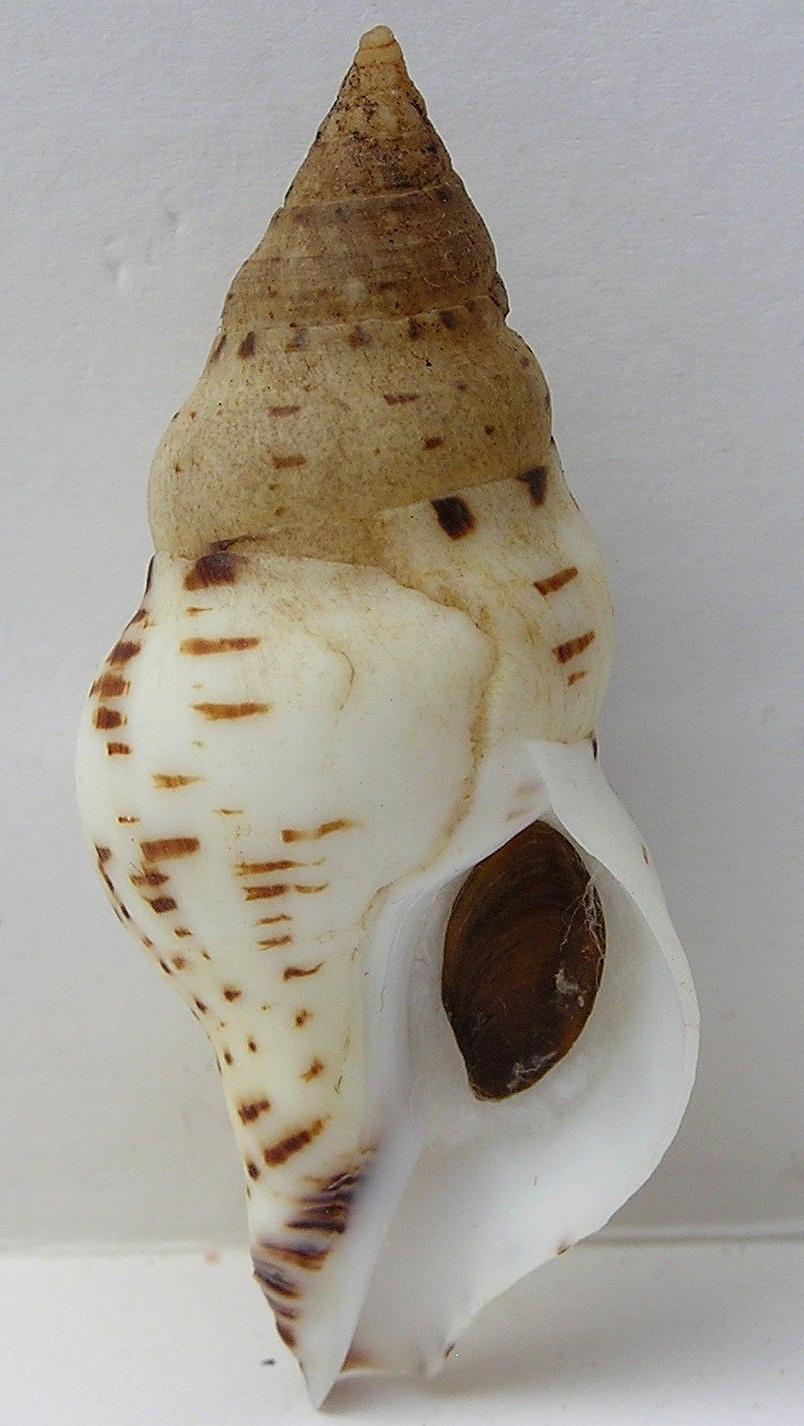
- Apertural view of Euthria calypso

Scientific classification
- Kingdom: Animalia
- Phylum: Mollusca
- Class: Gastropoda
- Subclass: Caenogastropoda
- Order: Neogastropoda
- Family: Tudiclidae
- Genus: Euthria
- Species: E. calypso

Binomial name
- Euthria calypso Cosel & Burnay, 1983

= Euthria calypso =

Species of gastropod

Euthria calypso is a species of sea snail, a marine gastropod mollusk in the family Buccinidae, the true whelks.

== Description ==
The size of an adult shell varies between 35 mm and 48 mm.

== Distribution ==
This species occurs in the Atlantic Ocean along the Cape Verdes.
