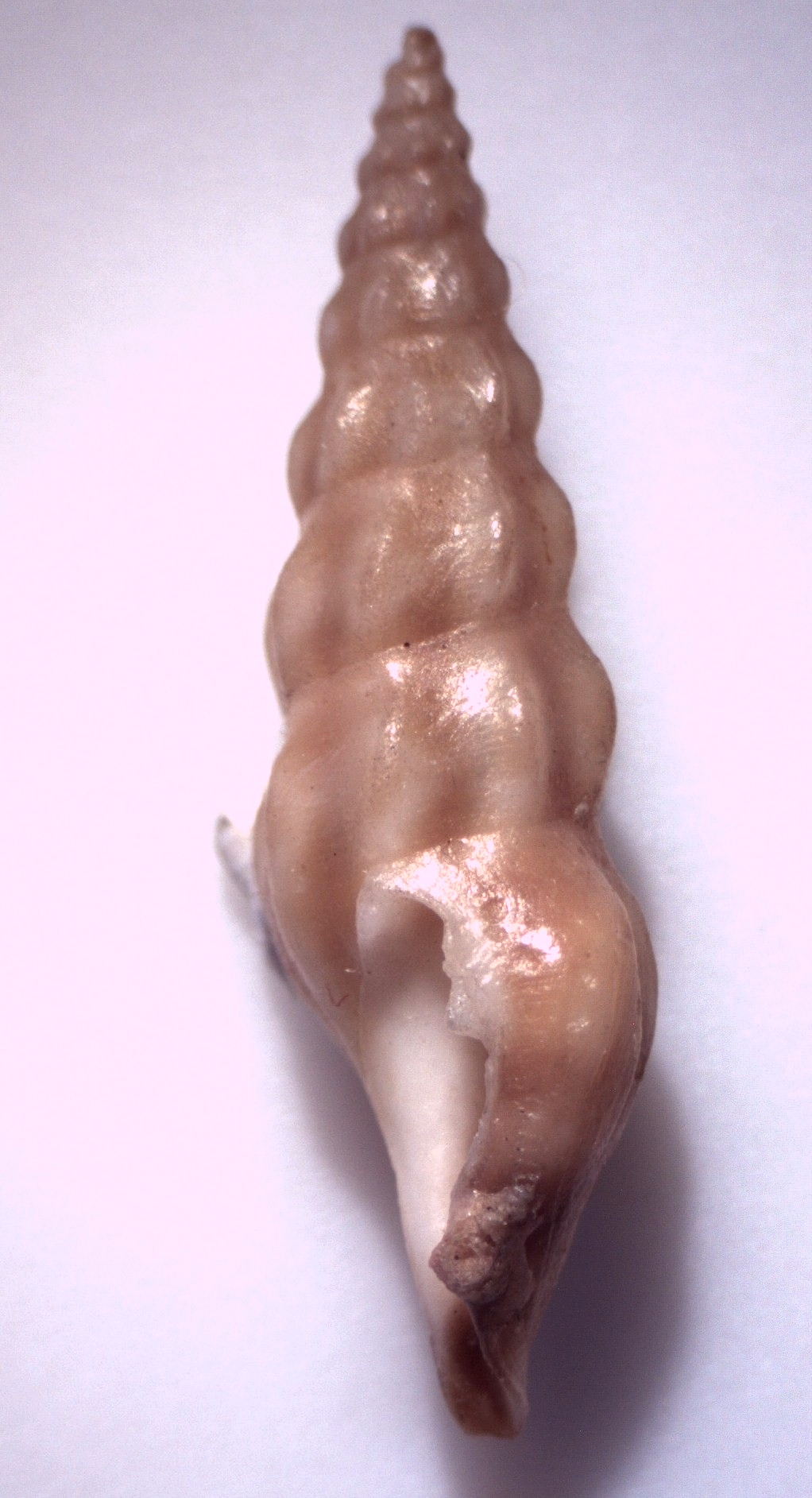
- Apertural view of a shell of Siphonofusus chinensis

Scientific classification
- Kingdom: Animalia
- Phylum: Mollusca
- Class: Gastropoda
- Subclass: Caenogastropoda
- Order: Neogastropoda
- Superfamily: Buccinoidea
- Family: Tudiclidae
- Genus: Siphonofusus; Cossmann, 1901

= Siphonofusus =

Genus of gastropods

Siphonofusus is a genus of sea snails, marine gastropod molluscs in the family Tudiclidae.

== Species ==
Species within the genus Siphonofusus include:

- Siphonofusus chinensis (MacNeil, 1960)
- Siphonofusus vicdani Kosuge, 1992

Species brought into synonymy

- Siphonofusus bradneri Drivas & Jay, 1990: synonym of Chryseofusus bradneri (Drivas & Jay, 1990)*
- Siphonofusus brunobrianoi: synonym of Buccinulum brunobrianoi Parth, 1993
- Siphonofusus chrysodomoides: synonym of Chryseofusus chrysodomoides (Schepman, 1911)
- Siphonofusus somalicus Parth, 1999: synonym of Euthria somalica (Parth, 1999)
