= Euthria fernandesi =

Scientific classification
- Kingdom: Animalia
- Phylum: Mollusca
- Class: Gastropoda
- Subclass: Caenogastropoda
- Order: Neogastropoda
- Family: Tudiclidae
- Genus: Euthria
- Species: E. fernandesi

Binomial name
- Euthria fernandesi Rolán, Monteiro & Fraussen, 2003

Species of gastropod

Euthria fernandesi is a species of sea snail, a marine gastropod mollusk in the family Buccinidae, the true whelks.
