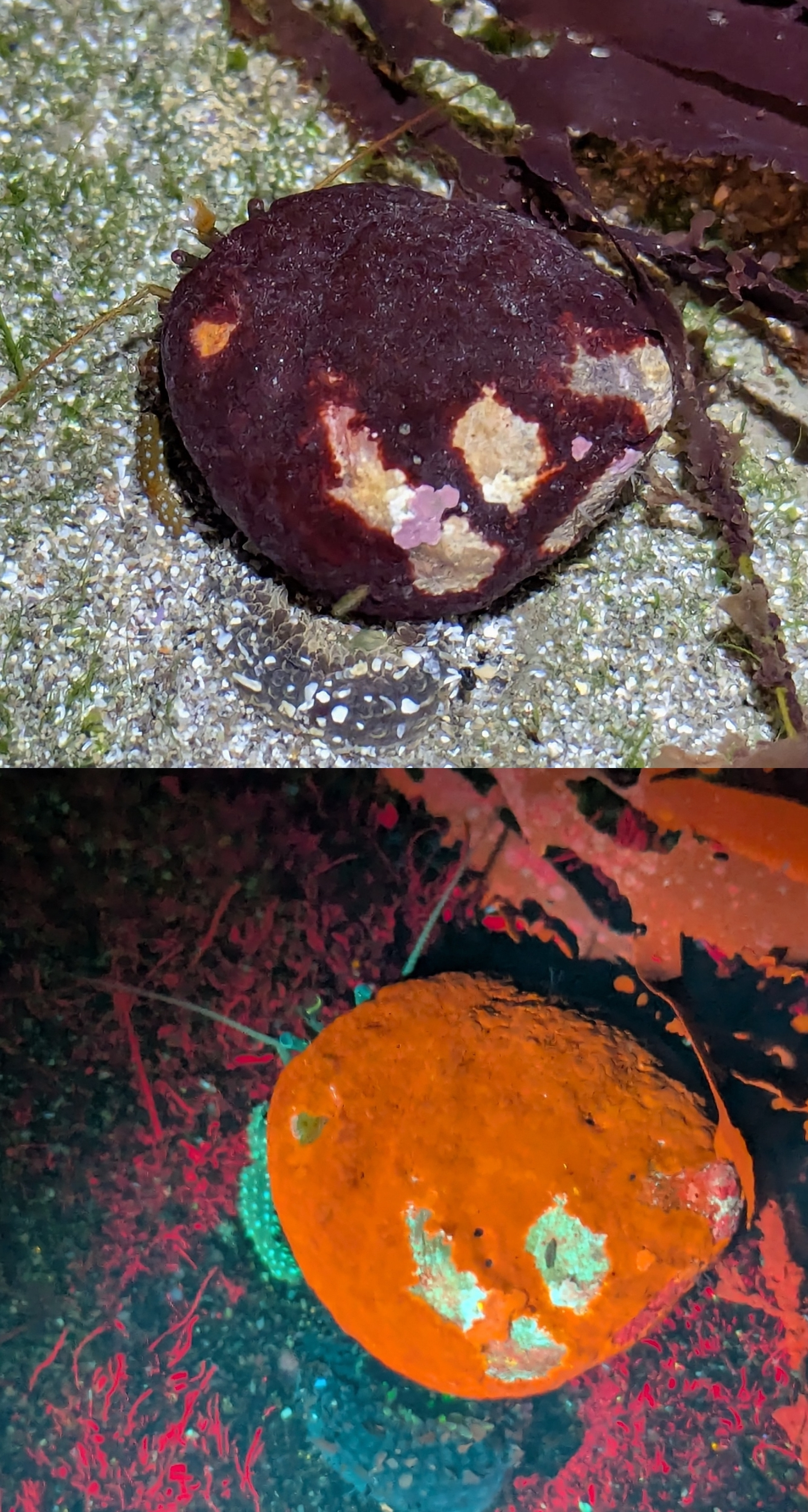
- Pagurus granosimanus observed under visible light and 365 nm UV light, San Mateo County, 2025

Scientific classification
- Kingdom: Animalia
- Phylum: Arthropoda
- Class: Malacostraca
- Order: Decapoda
- Suborder: Pleocyemata
- Infraorder: Anomura
- Family: Paguridae
- Genus: Pagurus
- Species: P. granosimanus

Binomial name
- Pagurus granosimanus Stimpson, 1858
- Pagurus granosimanus range map, estimated with the iNaturalist Geomodel, 2025

Synonyms
- Eupagurus granosimanus Stimpson, 1859

= Pagurus granosimanus =

Species of crustacean

Pagurus granosimanus is a species of hermit crab, commonly known as the grainy hermit crab. Its range extends from the Aleutian Islands in Alaska south to the Bahia de Todos Santos of Baja California, from the intertidal zone to a depth of 36 m (118 ft). The species was first described by American zoologist William Stimpson in 1859.

== Description ==
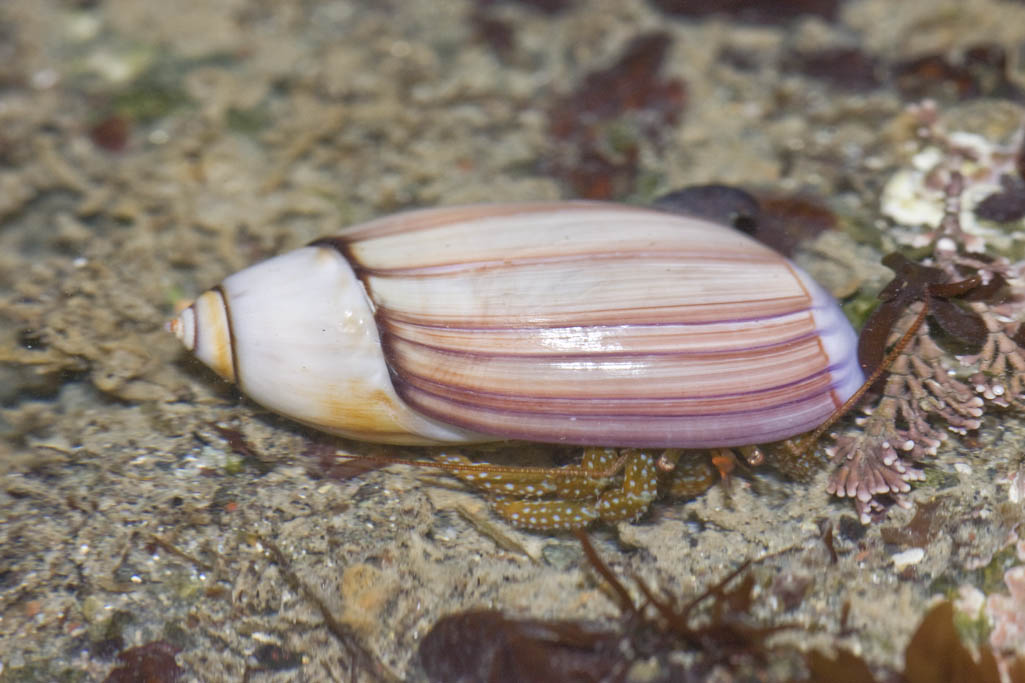
Pagurus granosimanus in the shell of Olivella biplicata, San Luis Obispo County

Pagurus granosimanus is a medium-sized hermit crab distinguished by the presence raised blue dots on its granular chelipeds and walking legs, which gives rise to its common name. The right chela is typically larger and more robust than the left, a common trait among hermit crabs. The adult's coloration is typically olive green, with orange antennae that lack banding.

== Natural history ==
Pagurus granosimanus prefers to dwell in the shells of Tegula funebralis, Lirabuccinum dirum, and Nucella lamellosa, particularly if the shell is large enough to withdraw inside completely. Smaller individuals often live inside the shells of Littorina sp. This hermit crab is mainly nocturnal, during which time it feeds on detritus from a wide variety of plants and animals. It is preyed upon by true crabs, pricklebacks, and various other fish.
