= Euthria pulicaria =

Scientific classification
- Kingdom: Animalia
- Phylum: Mollusca
- Class: Gastropoda
- Subclass: Caenogastropoda
- Order: Neogastropoda
- Family: Tudiclidae
- Genus: Euthria
- Species: E. pulicaria

Binomial name
- Euthria pulicaria Dautzenberg & Fisher, 1906

Species of gastropod

Euthria pulicaria is a species of sea snail, a marine gastropod mollusk in the family Buccinidae, the true whelks.
