= Siphonofusus vicdani =

Scientific classification
- Kingdom: Animalia
- Phylum: Mollusca
- Class: Gastropoda
- Subclass: Caenogastropoda
- Order: Neogastropoda
- Family: Tudiclidae
- Genus: Siphonofusus
- Species: S. vicdani

Binomial name
- Siphonofusus vicdani Kosuge, 1992

Species of gastropod

Siphonofusus vicdani is a species of sea snail, a marine gastropod mollusc in the family Tudiclidae, the true whelks.

== Description ==
This species attains a size of 100 mm.

== Distribution ==
Philippines.
