= Euthria effendyi =

Scientific classification
- Kingdom: Animalia
- Phylum: Mollusca
- Class: Gastropoda
- Subclass: Caenogastropoda
- Order: Neogastropoda
- Family: Tudiclidae
- Genus: Euthria
- Species: E. effendyi

Binomial name
- Euthria effendyi Fraussen & Dharma, 2002

Species of gastropod

Euthria effendyi is a species of sea snail, a marine gastropod mollusc in the family Buccinidae, the true whelks.
