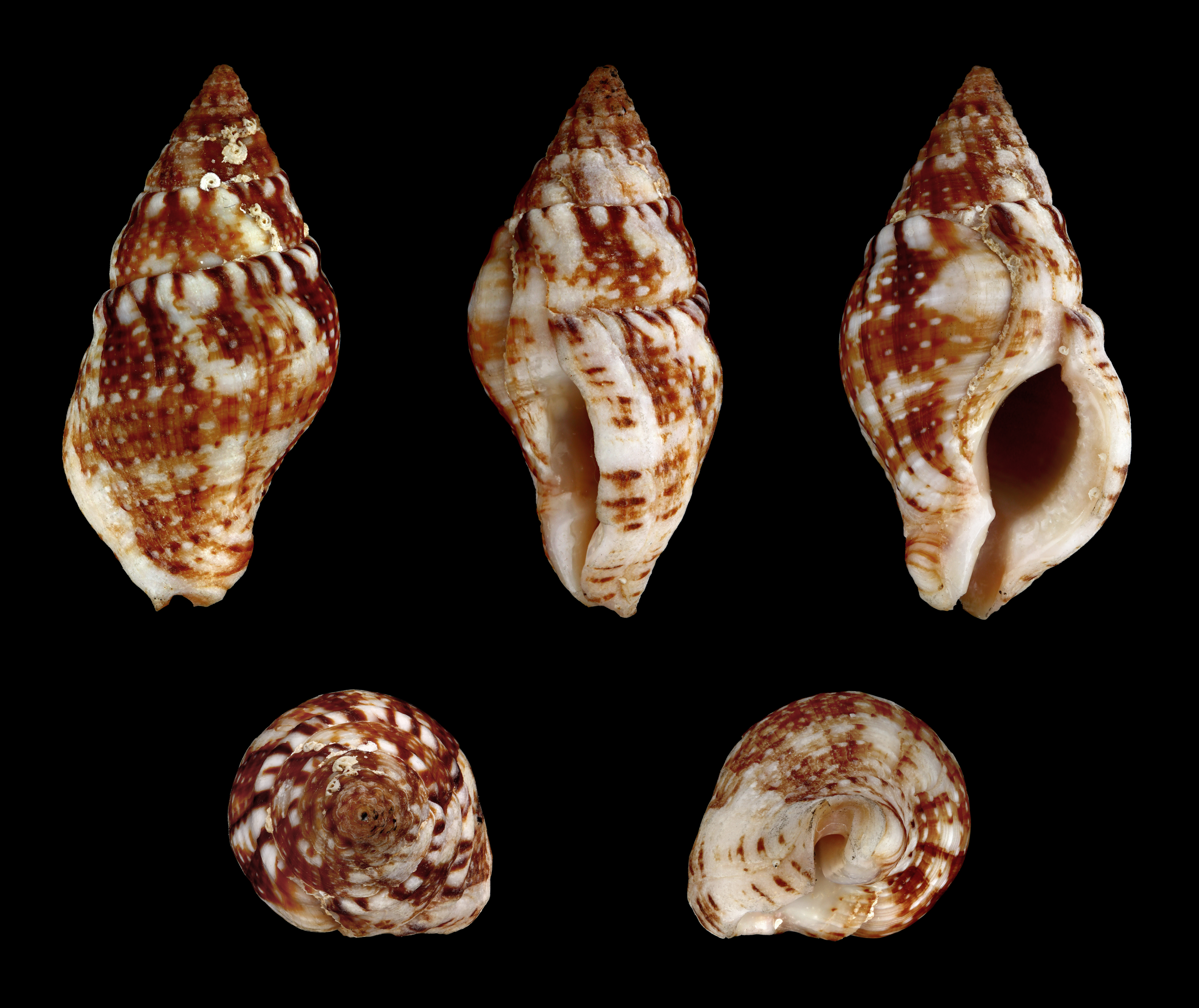

Scientific classification
- Kingdom: Animalia
- Phylum: Mollusca
- Class: Gastropoda
- Subclass: Caenogastropoda
- Order: Neogastropoda
- Family: Tudiclidae
- Genus: Euthria
- Species: E. cornea

Binomial name
- Euthria cornea (Linnaeus, 1758)

Synonyms
- Buccinulum corneum (Linnaeus, 1758); † Euthria cornea rhodiensis Bevilacqua, 1928; Euthria cornea var. bellardii de Gregorio, 1885; Euthria cornea var. caprica de Gregorio, 1885; Euthria cornea var. crassa Monterosato, 1884; Euthria cornea var. crassilabra de Gregorio, 1885; Euthria cornea var. elongata Monterosato, 1884; Euthria gracilis Locard, 1891; Euthria inflata Bellardi, 1872 (dubious synonym); Euthria lignarius Lamarck, J.B.P.A. de, 1816; Euthria magna Bellardi, 1872 (dubious synonym); Euthria major Locard, 1891; Euthria minor var. elongata Locard, 1886; Euthria obesa Bellardi, 1872 (dubious synonym); Fusus conulus Risso, 1826; Fusus lignarius Lamarck, 1816; Murex conulus Olivi, A.G., 1792; Murex corneus Linnaeus, 1758 (basionym); Purpura alba Risso, 1826

= Euthria cornea =

Euthria cornea Temporal range: Miocene - Recent

Species of gastropod

Euthria cornea, commonly known as the spindle euthria, is a species of sea snail, a marine gastropod mollusk in the family Buccinidae, the true whelks.

== Fossil reports ==
The fossil record of this species dates back to the Miocene (age range: from 11.608 to 7.246 million years ago). These fossils have been found in Italy.

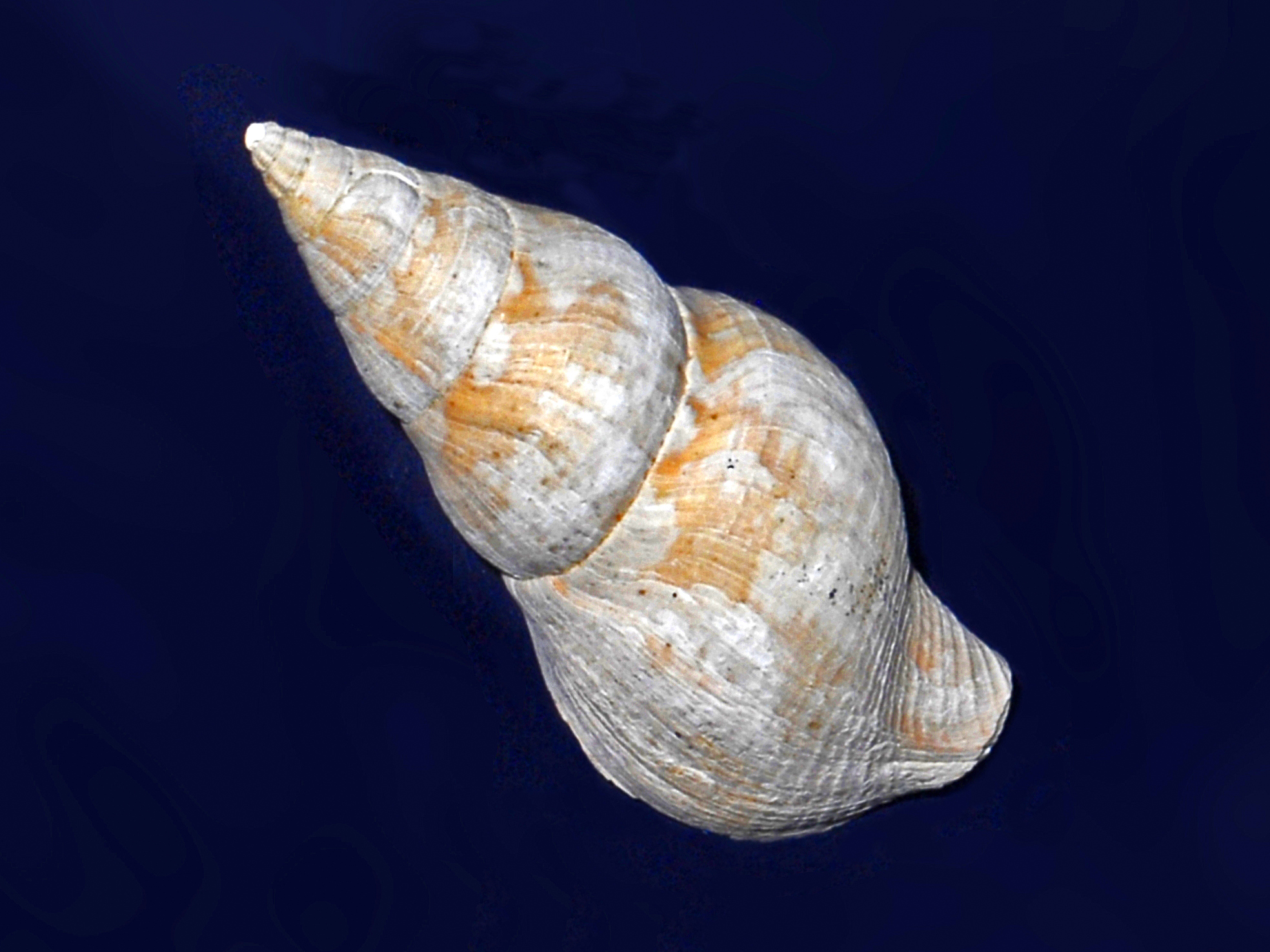
Fossil shell of Euthria cornea from Pliocene of Italy

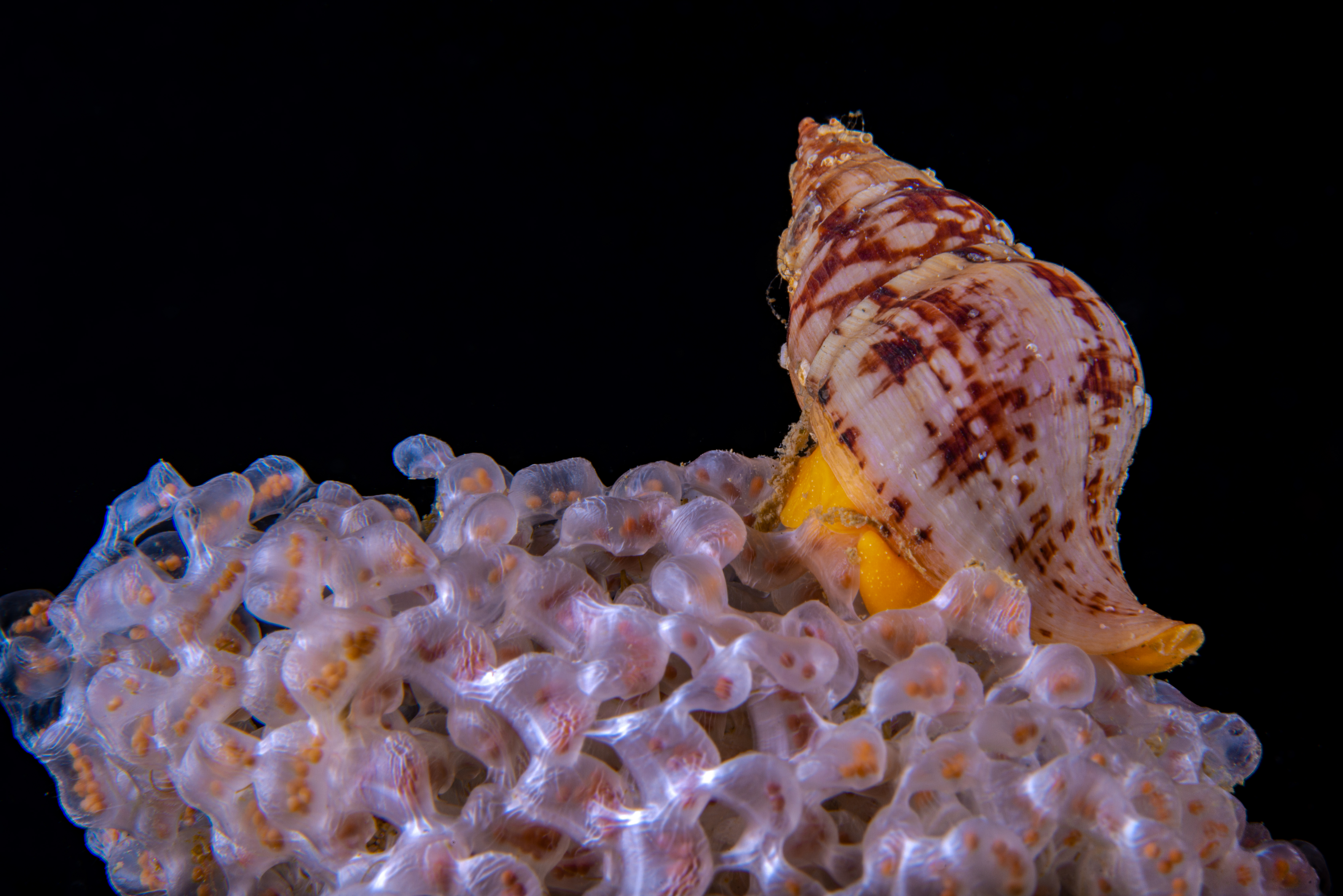
Euthria cornea laying capsules with eggs

== Description ==
The shell size of Euthria cornea varies between 20 mm and 80 mm. This mollusk has a robust fusiform shell, with a sharp apex. The opening is oval, wide, with slight striae. The horny operculum is oval. The coloration of the shell is quite variable, with irregular dark spots on a brownish-gray background. The mollusk is orange. This predatory species mainly feeds on small bivalves, opening slightly the valves with the strong foot and sucking the tissues.

== Distribution and habitat ==
This species occurs in the Atlantic Ocean off Portugal and Morocco and in the Mediterranean Sea. It can be found at depths of 5 to 30 m, mainly on rocky substrates.
