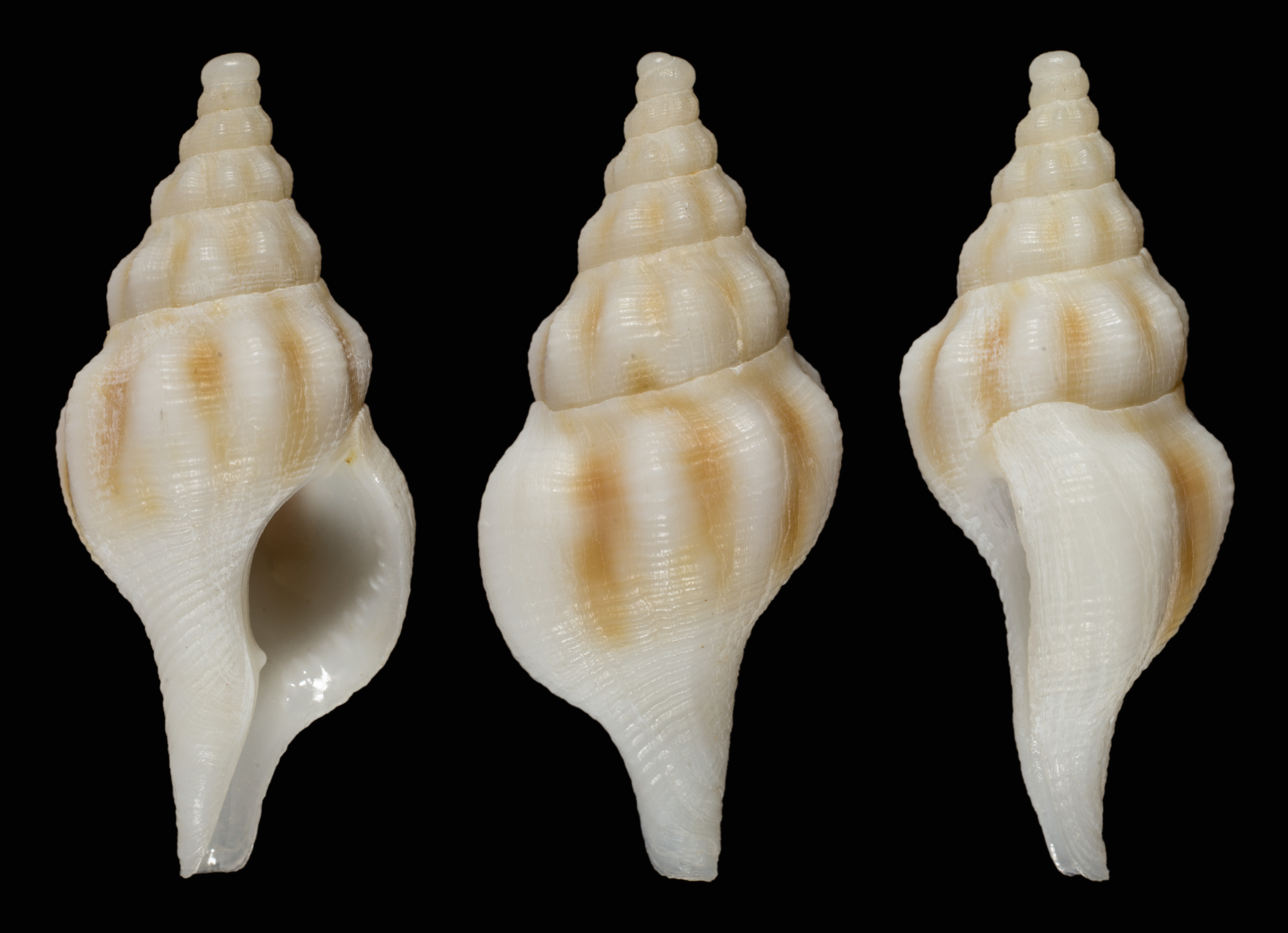
- Shell of Euthria scepta (holotype at MNHN, Paris)

Scientific classification
- Kingdom: Animalia
- Phylum: Mollusca
- Class: Gastropoda
- Subclass: Caenogastropoda
- Order: Neogastropoda
- Family: Tudiclidae
- Genus: Euthria
- Species: E. scepta

Binomial name
- Euthria scepta Fraussen & Hadorn, 2003

= Euthria scepta =

Species of sea snail

Euthria scepta is a species of sea snail, a marine gastropod mollusc in the family Buccinidae, the true whelks. Discovered in the deep-water benthos of the South Pacific, this species is endemic to the waters off New Caledonia.

== Taxonomy and naming ==
The species was formally described in 2003 by malacologists Koen Fraussen and Roland Hadorn. The description was based on material collected during French oceanographic expeditions conducted by the Muséum national d'histoire naturelle (MNHN) and the Institut de recherche pour le développement (IRD) to catalogue tropical deep-sea benthos.

The specific epithet scepta is derived from the Latin word sceptus, meaning "descending from the clouds". The holotype specimen (catalogued as MNHN-IM-2000-6829) is permanently housed in the malacology collections of the MNHN in Paris.

== Description ==
The shell of Euthria scepta attains a maximum length of 27.2 mm. Like other members of the genus Euthria, the shell morphology is adapted to a deep benthic marine environment.

== Distribution and habitat ==
This marine species occurs exclusively off New Caledonia, with specific concentrations in the southern marine sectors including the Île des Pins. The original paratype material was dredged by the French research vessel Vauban in September 1986.
