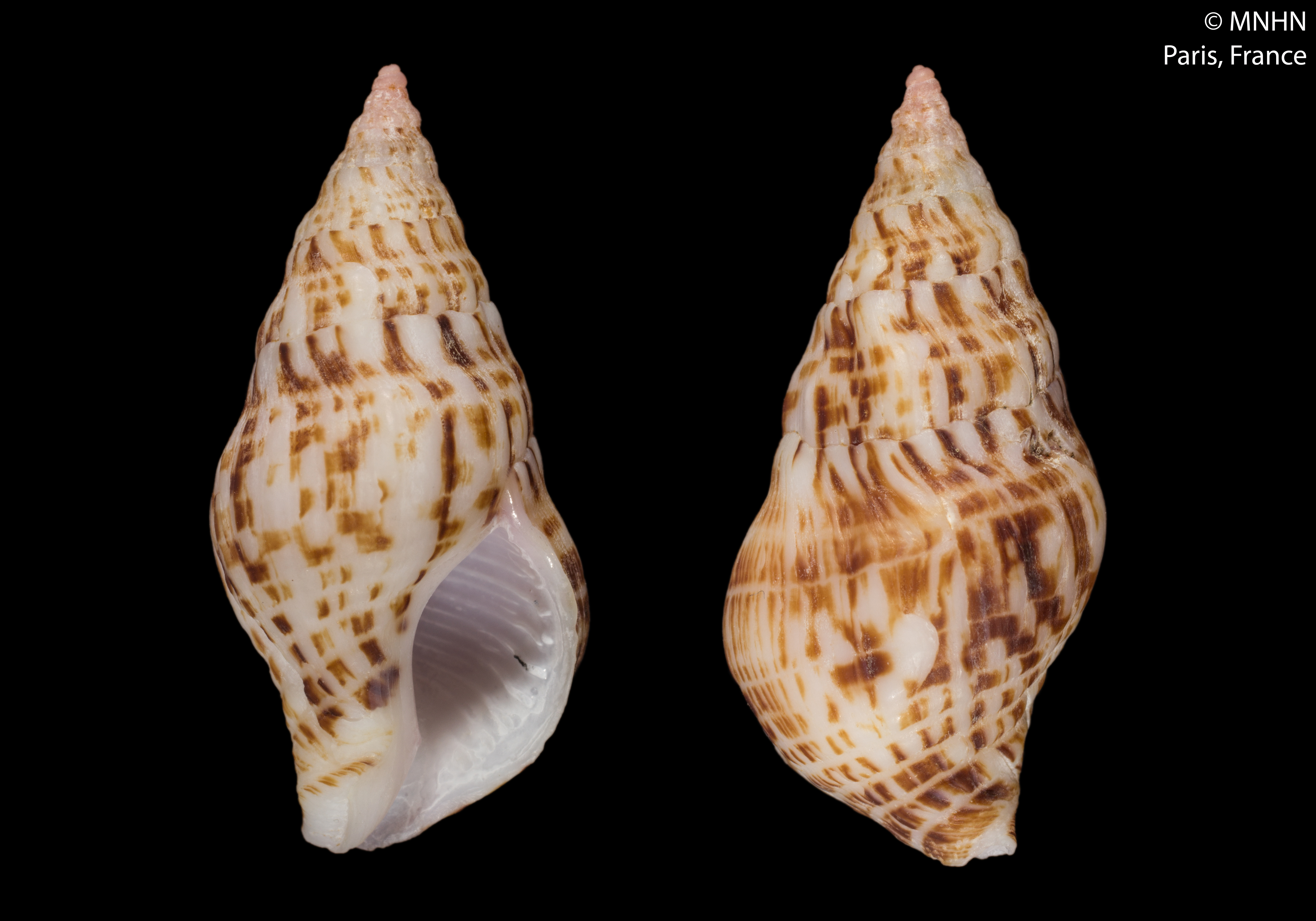
- Shell of Euthria marianae (holotype at MNHN, Paris)

Scientific classification
- Kingdom: Animalia
- Phylum: Mollusca
- Class: Gastropoda
- Subclass: Caenogastropoda
- Order: Neogastropoda
- Family: Tudiclidae
- Genus: Euthria
- Species: E. marianae

Binomial name
- Euthria marianae Rolán, Monteiro & Fraussen, 2003

Synonyms
- Euthria cecilea Fraussen & Rolán, 2003

= Euthria marianae =

Species of gastropod

Euthria marianae is a species of sea snail, a marine gastropod mollusk in the family Buccinidae, the true whelks.

== Description ==
The length of the shell attains 33 mm.

== Distribution ==
This marine species occurs off the Cape Verdes.
