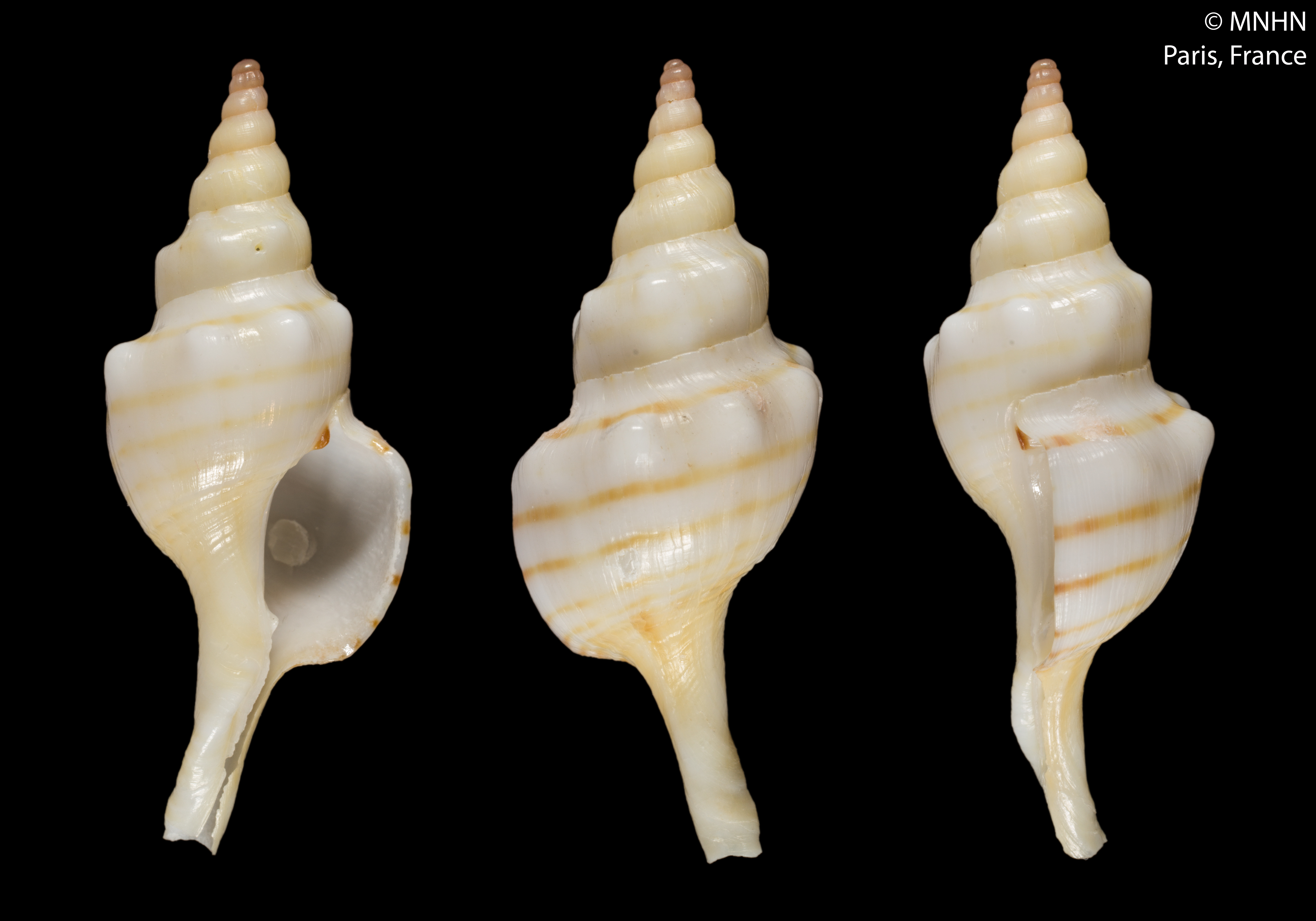
- Shell of Euthria solifer (holotype at MNHN, Paris)

Scientific classification
- Kingdom: Animalia
- Phylum: Mollusca
- Class: Gastropoda
- Subclass: Caenogastropoda
- Order: Neogastropoda
- Family: Tudiclidae
- Genus: Euthria
- Species: E. solifer

Binomial name
- Euthria solifer Fraussen & Hadorn, 2003

= Euthria solifer =

Species of gastropod

Euthria solifer is a species of sea snail, a marine gastropod mollusk in the family Buccinidae, the true whelks.

== Description ==
The length of the shell attains 47.7 mm.

== Distribution ==
This marine species occurs off New Caledonia.
