= Boavistensis =

Boavistensis is Latin for "of the island of Boa Vista", an island of Cape Verde. It may refer to several species found on the island and in the surrounding waters:

- Conus boavistensis, a species of cone snails
- Euthria boavistensis, a species of true whelks
- Hemidactylus boavistensis, a species of geckos
- Manzonia boavistensis, a species of small sea snail
- Pentagonica boavistensis, a species of beetles
- Tarentola boavistensis, a species of wall geckos

It also may refer to a subspecies:

- Agaronia acuminata boavistensis, a subspecies of Agaronia acuminata
- Chioniina spinalis boavistensis, a subspecies of Chioninia spinalis
