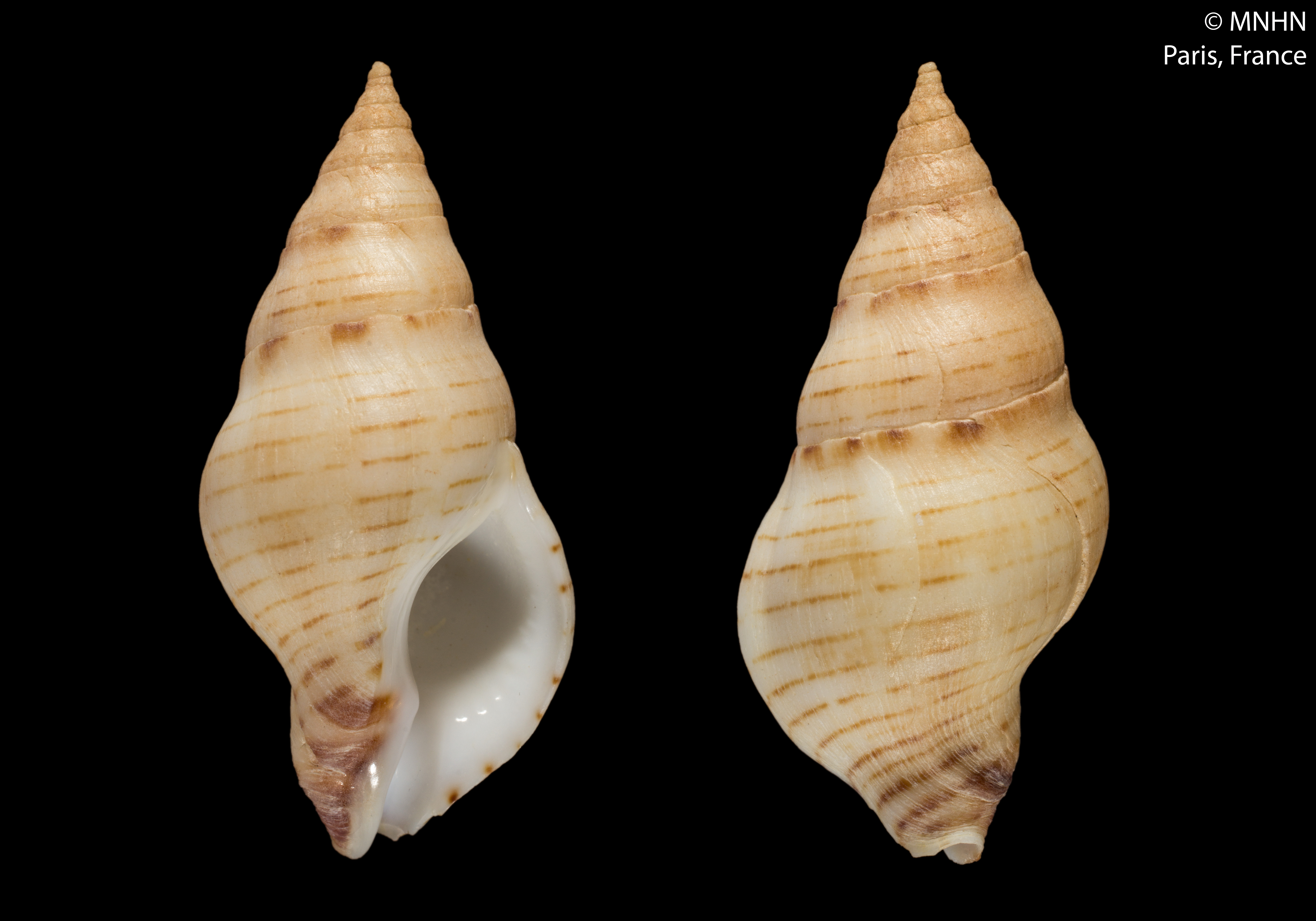
- Shell of Euthria amorimi (holotype at MNHN, Paris)

Scientific classification
- Kingdom: Animalia
- Phylum: Mollusca
- Class: Gastropoda
- Subclass: Caenogastropoda
- Order: Neogastropoda
- Family: Tudiclidae
- Genus: Euthria
- Species: E. amorimi

Binomial name
- Euthria amorimi Fraussen, 2004

= Euthria amorimi =

Species of gastropod

Euthria amorimi is a species of sea snail, a marine gastropod mollusk in the family Buccinidae, the true whelks.

== Description ==
The length of the shell attains 40 mm.

== Distribution ==
This marine species occurs off the Cape Verdes.
