= Euthria javanica =

Scientific classification
- Kingdom: Animalia
- Phylum: Mollusca
- Class: Gastropoda
- Subclass: Caenogastropoda
- Order: Neogastropoda
- Family: Tudiclidae
- Genus: Euthria
- Species: E. javanica

Binomial name
- Euthria javanica Fraussen & Dekker, 2002

Species of gastropod

Euthria javanica is a species of sea snail, a marine gastropod mollusc in the family Buccinidae, the true whelks.
