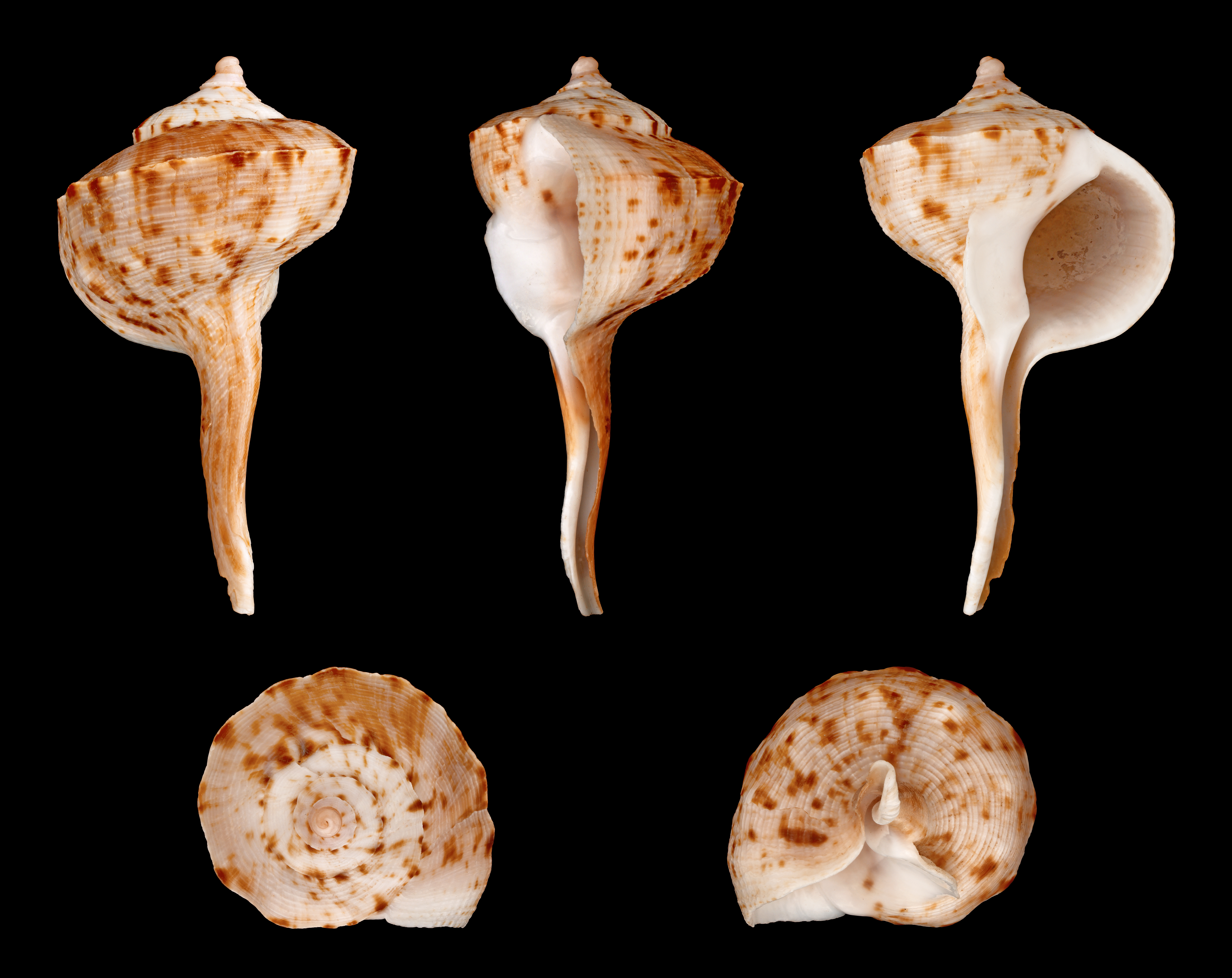
- Tudicla Spirillus

Scientific classification
- Kingdom: Animalia
- Phylum: Mollusca
- Class: Gastropoda
- Subclass: Caenogastropoda
- Order: Neogastropoda
- Superfamily: Buccinoidea
- Family: Tudiclidae
- Genus: Tudicla; Röding, 1798

Synonyms
- Murex (Pyrenella) Gray, 1857 (objective synonym; possibly a...); Pyrella Swainson, 1835 (objective synonym); Pyrula (Pyrella) Swainson, 1835 junior objective synonym; Spirillus Schlüter, 1838 (objective synonym); Tudicula de Ryckholt, 1862 (unjustified emendation)

= Tudicla =

Genus of gastropods

Tudicla is a genus of sea snails, marine gastropod mollusks in the family Tudiclidae, the true whelks.

== Description ==
The shell is fusiform. The spire is very short, the apex papillary. The aperture is oval. The siphonal canal is very long and straight. The columella is smooth, flattened and with a single fold at the fore part.

The papillary apex of the spire, the single plait on the columella, and the long straight beak, are the chief characteristics of this genus.

== Species ==
- † Tudicla angulata (Tate, 1888)
- †Tudicla doylei Stilwell & Zinsmeister, 1992
- † Tudicla rusticula (Basterot, 1825)
- Tudicla spirillus (Linnaeus, 1767)
- † Tudicla turbinata (Tate, 1888)
- † Tudicla zottmaieri Traub, 1979

Synonyms

- † Subgenus Tudicla (Pyropsis) Conrad, 1860: synonym of † Pyropsis Conrad, 1860 (original rank)

Subgenus Tudicla (Tudicula) H. Adams & A. Adams, 1864: synonym of Tudicula H. Adams & A. Adams, 1864: synonym of Tudivasum Rosenberg & Petit, 1987 (original rank)

- Tudicla (Tudicula) kurtzi Macpherson, 1964: synonym of Tudivasum kurtzi (Macpherson, 1964)
- Tudicla (Tudicula) spinosa H. Adams & A. Adams, 1864: synonym of Tudivasum spinosum (H. Adams & A. Adams, 1864) (superseded combination)
- Tudicla armigera A. Adams, 1856: synonym of Tudivasum armigerum (A. Adams, 1856) (original combination)
- Tudicla blosvillei (Deshayes, 1832): synonym of Lataxiena blosvillei (Deshayes, 1832)
- Tudicla carinata Röding, 1798: synonym of Tudicla spirillus (Linnaeus, 1767)
- Tudicla gutturnia Röding, 1798: synonym of Ranularia gutturnia (Röding, 1798) (original combination)
- † Tudicla neozelanica Suter, 1917: synonym of † Fascioplex neozelanica (Suter, 1917)
- Tudicla recurva A. Adams, 1855: synonym of Afer porphyrostoma (Reeve, 1847) (unaccepted > junior subjective synonym)
- Tudicla spinosa H. Adams & A. Adams, 1864: synonym of Tudivasum spinosum (H. Adams & A. Adams, 1864) (superseded combination)
- Tudicla fusoides A. Adams, 1855 (uncertain, use in recent literature not established by editor)
