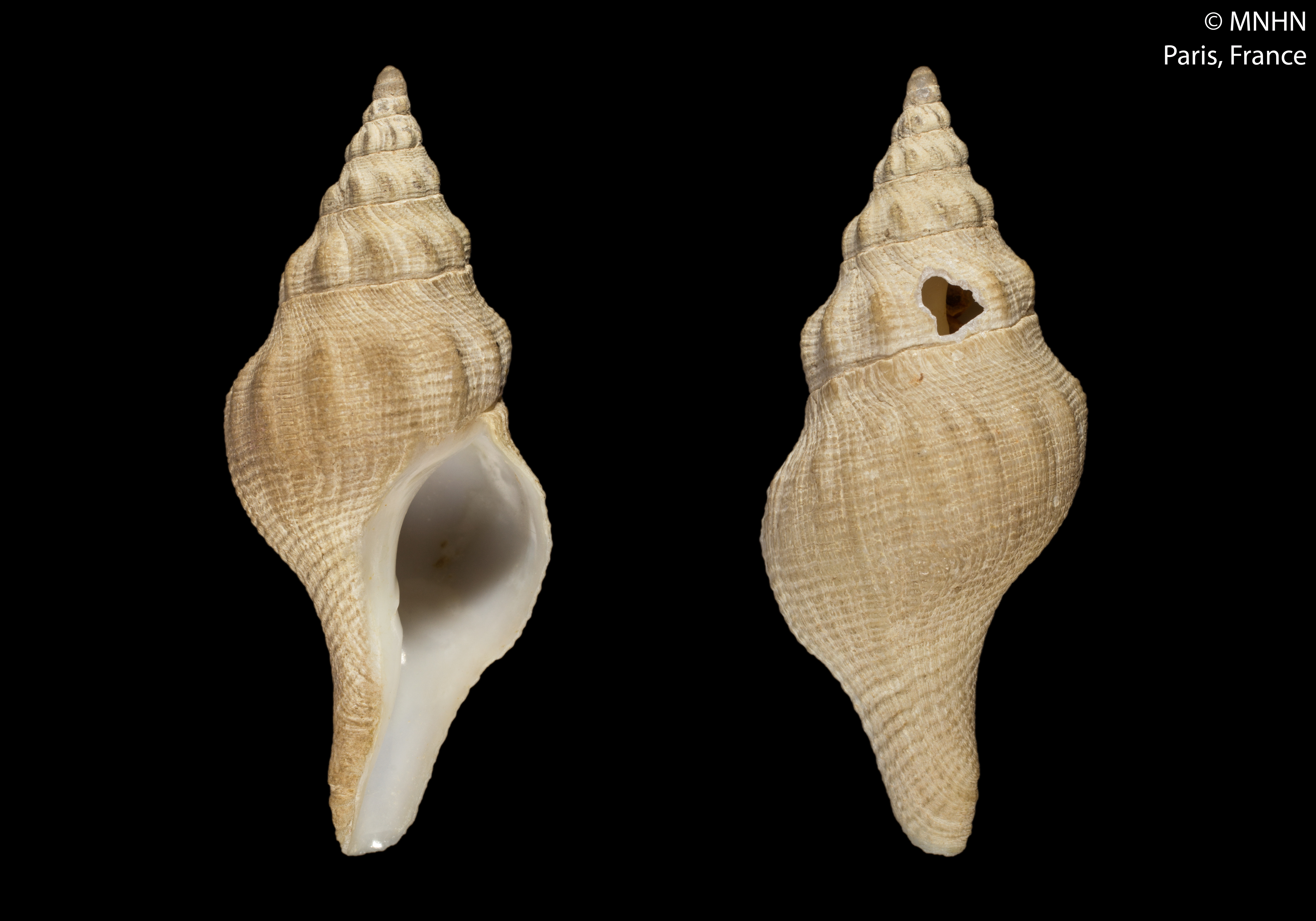
- Shell of Euthriostoma saharicum

Scientific classification
- Kingdom: Animalia
- Phylum: Mollusca
- Class: Gastropoda
- Subclass: Caenogastropoda
- Order: Neogastropoda
- Superfamily: Buccinoidea
- Family: Tudiclidae
- Genus: Euthriostoma; Marche-Marchard & Brebion, 1977

Type species
- Euthriostoma gliberti Marche-Marchad & Brébion, 1977

= Euthriostoma =

Genus of gastropods

Euthriostoma is a genus of sea snails, marine gastropod mollusks in the family Tudiclidae, the true whelks.

== Species ==
Species within the genus Euthriostoma include:

- Euthriostoma saharicum (Locard, 1897)

Species brought into synonymy

- Euthriostoma gliberti Marche-Marchad & Brébion, 1977 : synonym of Euthriostoma saharicum (Locard, 1897)
