= Euthria somalica =

Scientific classification
- Kingdom: Animalia
- Phylum: Mollusca
- Class: Gastropoda
- Subclass: Caenogastropoda
- Order: Neogastropoda
- Family: Tudiclidae
- Genus: Euthria
- Species: E. somalica

Binomial name
- Euthria somalica (Parth, 1999)

Synonyms
- Siphonofusus somalicus Parth, 1999

Species of gastropod

Euthria somalica is a species of sea snail, a marine gastropod mollusk in the family Buccinidae, the true whelks.

== Description ==
The size of the shell attains 71 mm. The Euthria somalica ranges in shades of brown, inside a swirled shell.

== Distribution ==
This marine species occurs off Somalia.
