= Euthria boavistensis =

Scientific classification
- Kingdom: Animalia
- Phylum: Mollusca
- Class: Gastropoda
- Subclass: Caenogastropoda
- Order: Neogastropoda
- Family: Tudiclidae
- Genus: Euthria
- Species: E. boavistensis

Binomial name
- Euthria boavistensis Cosel, 1982

Species of gastropod

Euthria boavistensis is a species of sea snail, a marine gastropod mollusk in the family Buccinidae, the true whelks.

== Distribution ==
They are found exclusively in Cape Verde.
