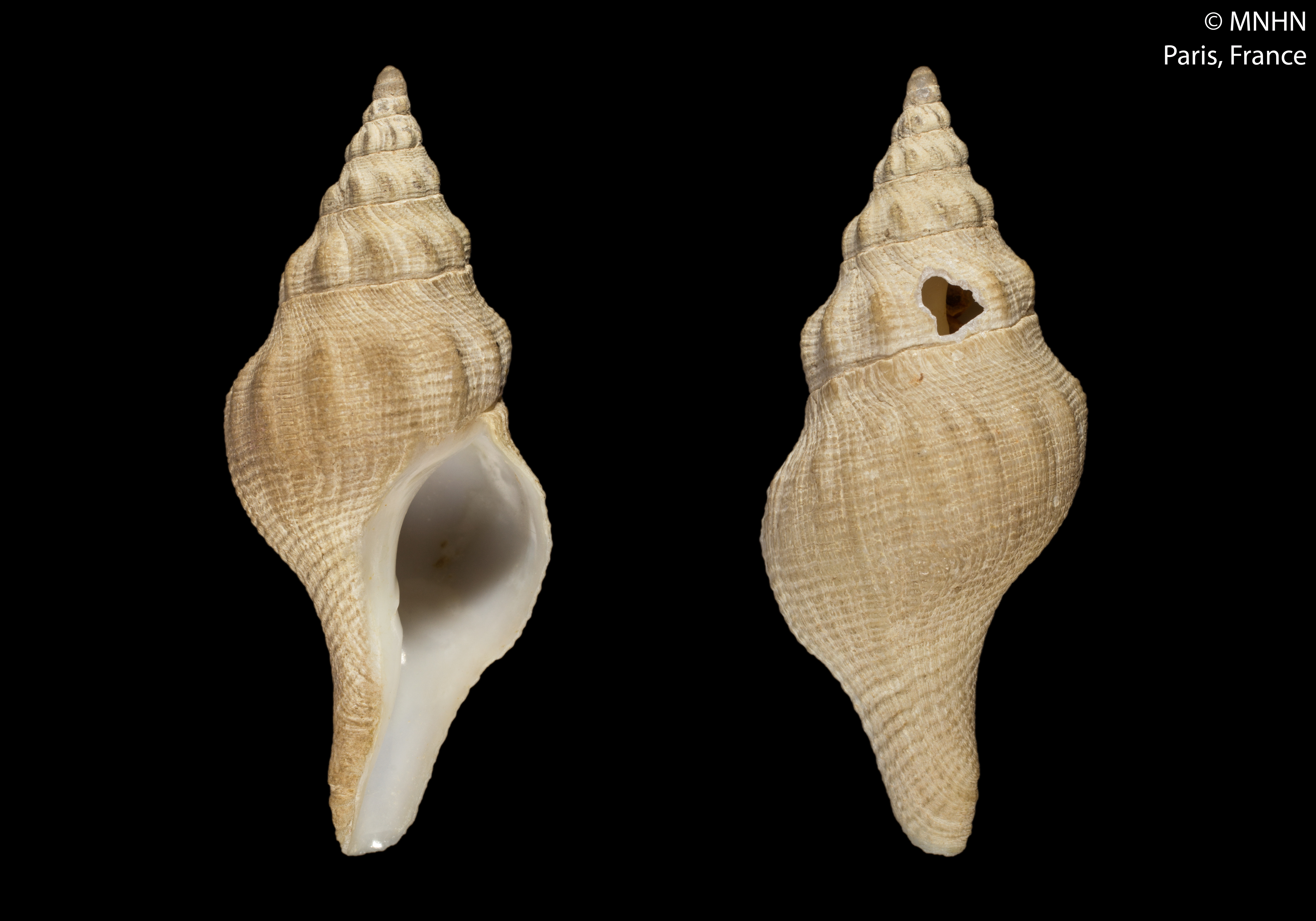
- Shell of Euthriostoma saharicum (holotype at MNHN, Paris)

Scientific classification
- Kingdom: Animalia
- Phylum: Mollusca
- Class: Gastropoda
- Subclass: Caenogastropoda
- Order: Neogastropoda
- Family: Tudiclidae
- Genus: Euthriostoma
- Species: E. saharicum

Binomial name
- Euthriostoma saharicum (Locard, 1897)

Synonyms
- Euthria saharica Locard, 1897 (original combination); Euthriostoma gliberti Marche-Marchad & Brébion, 1977; Metzgeria apodema Bouchet & Talavera, 1981

= Euthriostoma saharicum =

Species of gastropod

Euthriostoma saharicum is a species of sea snail, a marine gastropod mollusk in the family Buccinidae, the true whelks.

== Description ==
The length of the shell attains 43.5mm (4.35cm), and can reach lengths up to 87.2mm (8.72cm).

== Distribution ==
This marine species occurs off Mauritania.
