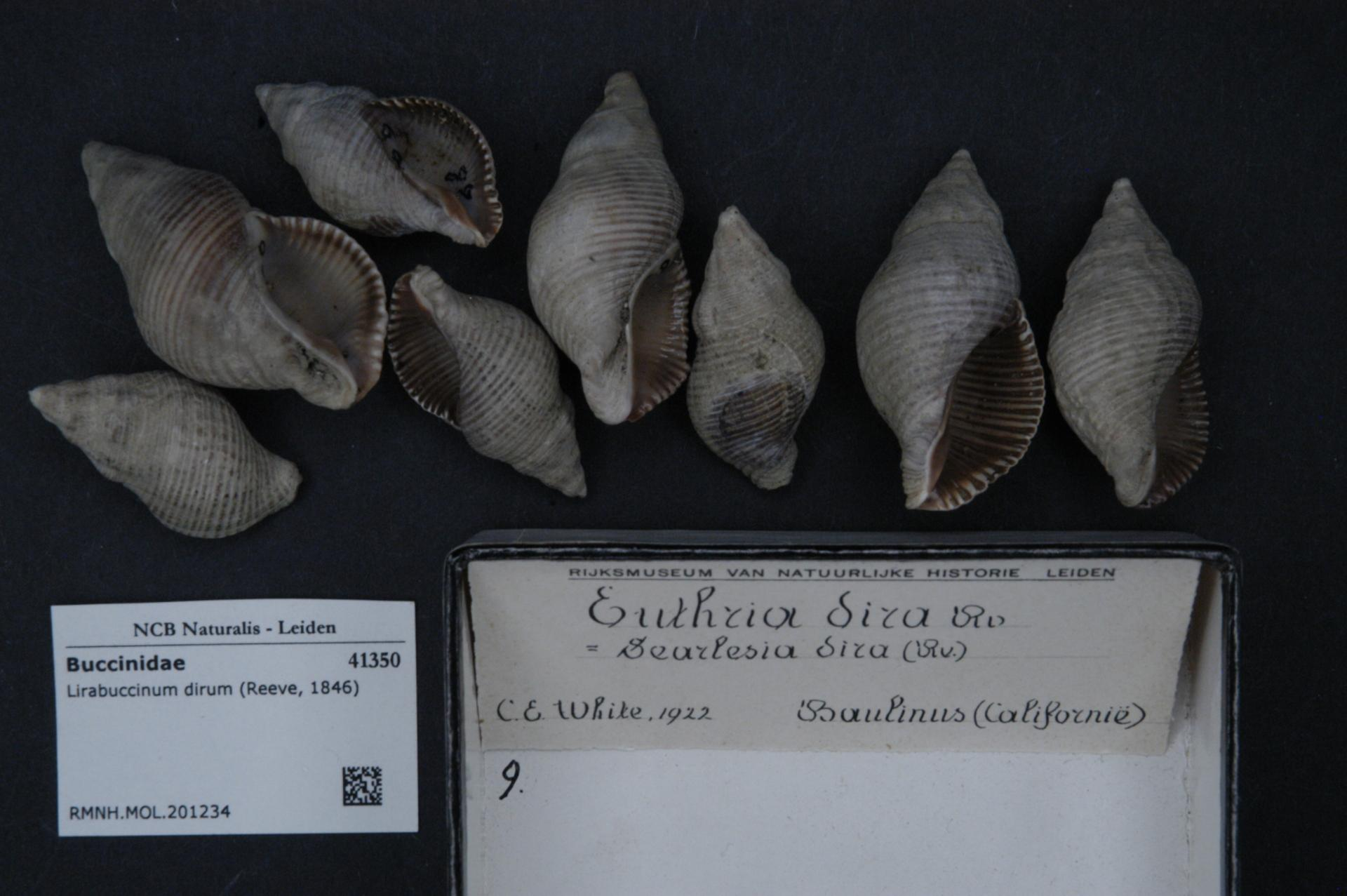

Scientific classification
- Kingdom: Animalia
- Phylum: Mollusca
- Class: Gastropoda
- Subclass: Caenogastropoda
- Order: Neogastropoda
- Family: Tudiclidae
- Genus: Lirabuccinum
- Species: L. dirum

Binomial name
- Lirabuccinum dirum (Reeve, 1846)

Synonyms
- Buccinum dirum Reeve, 1846; Searlesia dira (Reeve, 1846)

= Lirabuccinum dirum =

Species of mollusc

Lirabuccinum dirum, commonly known as the dire whelk, the spindle shell or the spindle whelk, is a species of sea snail, a marine gastropod mollusk in the family Tudiclidae, the true whelks.

It used to be known as Searlesia dira and Buccinum dirum before being transferred to the genus Lirabuccinum.

== Taxonomy and nomenclature ==
The dire whelk was first described by Lovell Augustus Reeve in 1846 as Buccinum dirum. In the early 20th century, William Healey Dall would come to the conclusion that the species belong to a genus up until then known only from the Atlantic fossil record, Searlesia. This remained the status quo for most of the century, with more living species from both the Atlantic and Pacific added to Searlesia until 1991, when Geerat J. Vermeij split the Pacific species into a separate genus Lirabuccinum with B. dirum as its type.

== Description ==
L. dirum is a medium-sized, elongated whelk with a strong heavy shell, growing to a length of 45 mm (1.8 in). There are four or five whorls separated by shallow grooves, and several rounded axial ribs, mainly on the spire. The first whorl of the shell (and the second whorl in young individuals) is sculptured with many narrow, evenly-spaced spiral ridges, which are also visible on the inside of the outer margin of the aperture. The aperture is an elongated oval-shape and can be closed with a horny operculum. There is a short siphonal canal to accommodate the siphon, and a polished columella with no folds. This snail is usually grey or brownish-grey, but is occasionally orangish.

== Distribution and habitat ==
This whelk is found in shallow waters in the northeastern Pacific Ocean. Its range extends from the Chirikof Island in Alaska to Monterey Bay in central California. It is particularly common in British Columbia, Washington state and Oregon, but uncommon in California. It is found intertidally on rocky shores and in the shallow subtidal zone, and is found down to about 35 m (115 ft) on the Cobb Seamount. As well as occurring on rocks, it is sometimes found on gravel or mud close to the foot of rocks in bays.

== Ecology ==
L. dirum is a predator and scavenger. It feeds on winkles, limpets, mussels, barnacles, chitons, worms and other invertebrates. It seems to specialise on dead or injured prey, and does not seem able to drill into intact shells in the way that many whelks do. When living intertidally it is subject to variations in salinity, and is particularly tolerant of low salinities. In fact it seeks out low salinity environments where other less tolerant organisms are stressed. It also consumes carrion, and extends its proboscis to feed on tubeworms inside their tubes or to share the prey being digested by the everted stomach of the ochre sea star.
