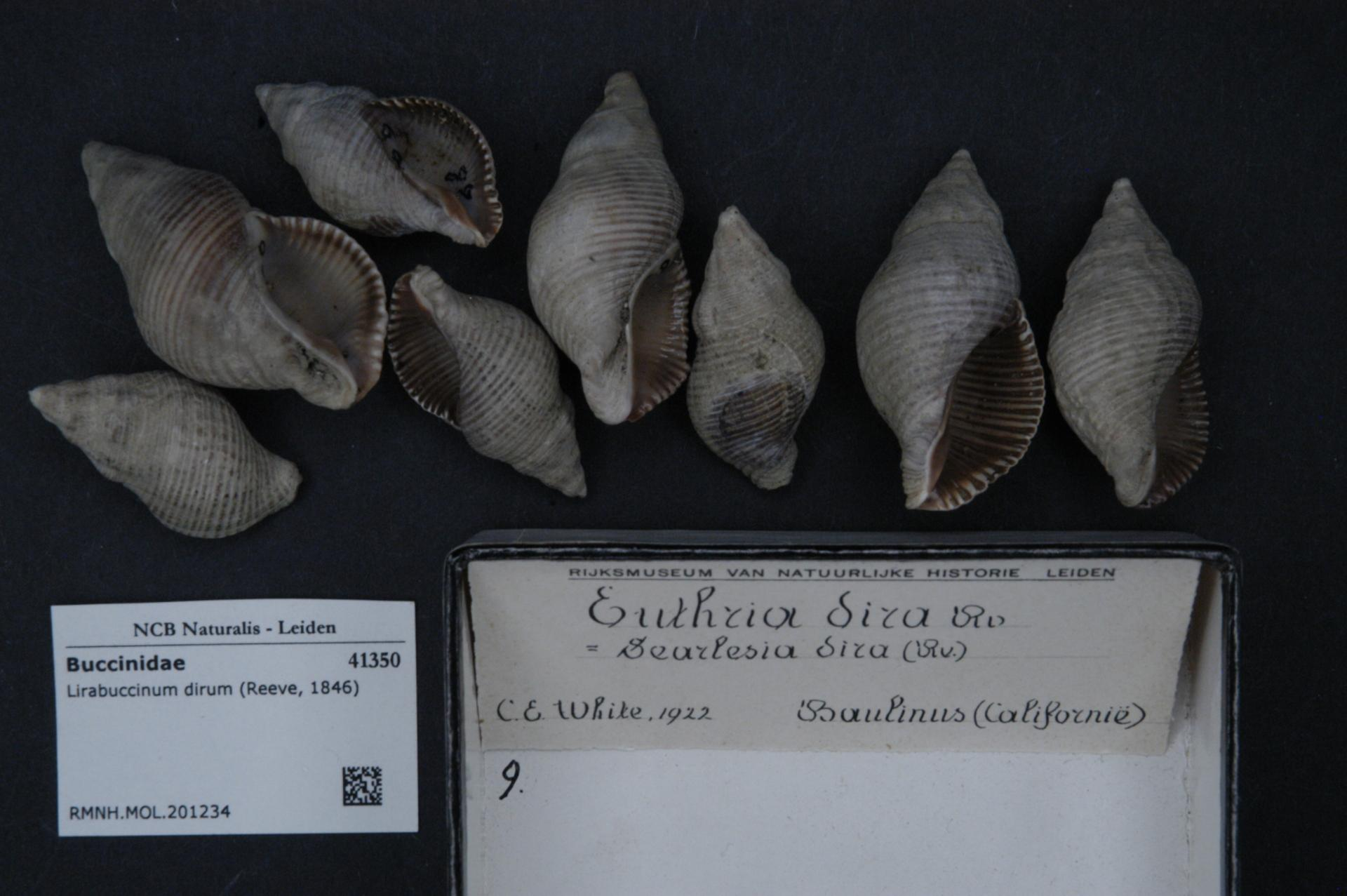
- Lirabuccinum dirum

Scientific classification
- Kingdom: Animalia
- Phylum: Mollusca
- Class: Gastropoda
- Subclass: Caenogastropoda
- Order: Neogastropoda
- Superfamily: Buccinoidea
- Family: Tudiclidae
- Genus: Lirabuccinum; Vermeij, 1991

Type species
- Buccinum dirum Reeve, 1846

= Lirabuccinum =

Genus of gastropods

Lirabuccinum is a genus of sea snails, marine gastropod mollusks in the family Tudiclidae, the true whelks.

== Species ==
Species within the genus Lirabuccinum listed by the World Register of Marine Species include:

- Lirabuccinum dirum (Reeve, 1846)
- Lirabuccinum fuscolabiatum (E. A. Smith, 1875)
- Lirabuccinum hokkaidonis (Pilsbry, 1901)
- Lirabuccinum musculus Callomon & Lawless, 2013

Species brought into synonymy

- Lirabuccinum constrictum (Dall, 1918): synonym of Lirabuccinum fuscolabiatum (E. A. Smith, 1875)
