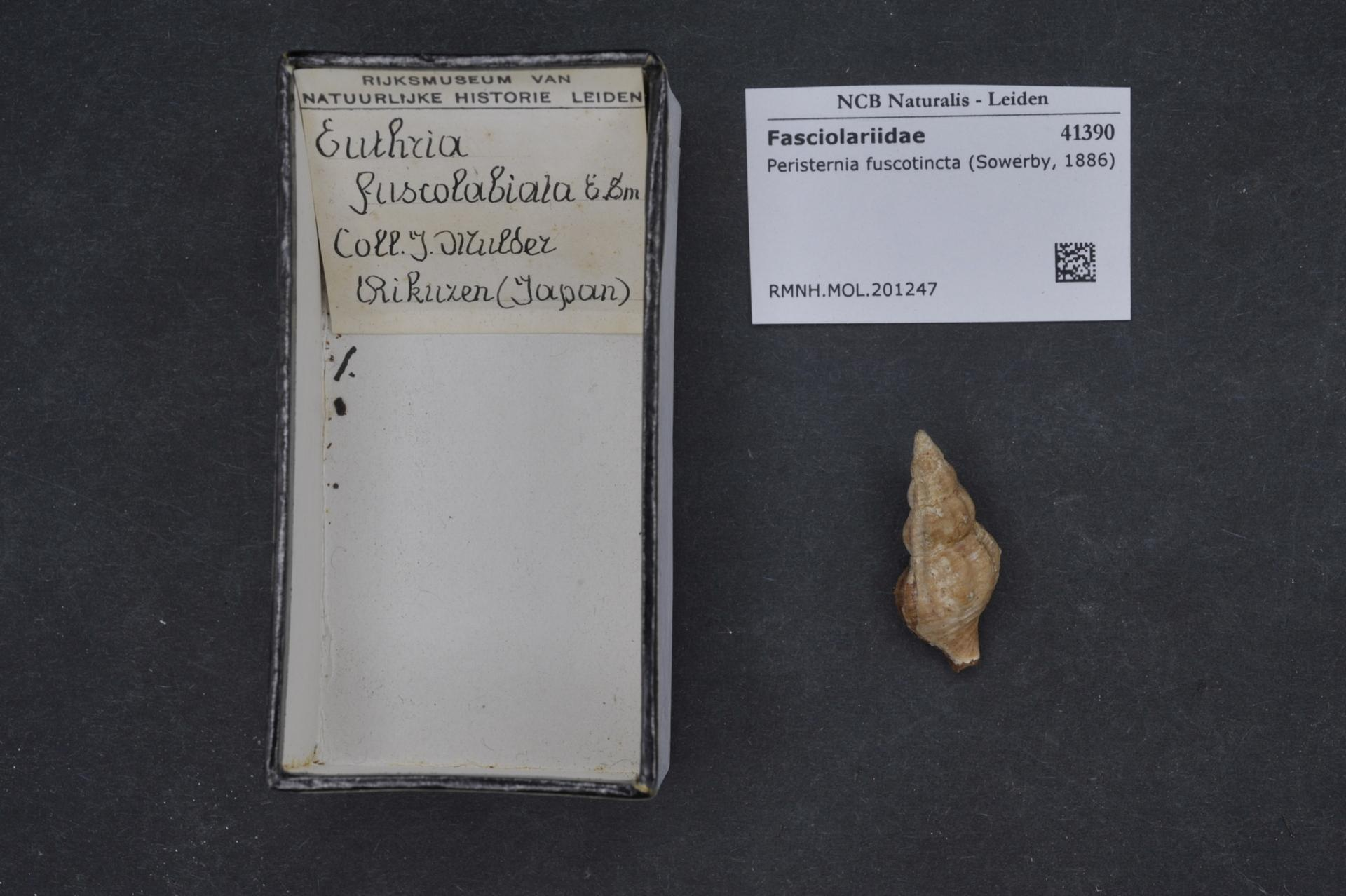

Scientific classification
- Kingdom: Animalia
- Phylum: Mollusca
- Class: Gastropoda
- Subclass: Caenogastropoda
- Order: Neogastropoda
- Family: Fasciolariidae
- Genus: Peristernia
- Species: P. fuscotincta

Binomial name
- Peristernia fuscotincta (G.B. Sowerby III, 1886)

Synonyms
- Euthria fuscotincta G.B. Sowerby III, 1886

= Peristernia fuscotincta =

Species of gastropod

Peristernia fuscotincta is a species of sea snail, a marine gastropod mollusk in the family Fasciolariidae, the spindle snails, the tulip snails and their allies.
