= Tudiclidae =

Scientific classification
- Kingdom: Animalia
- Phylum: Mollusca
- Class: Gastropoda
- Subclass: Caenogastropoda
- Order: Neogastropoda
- Superfamily: Buccinoidea
- Family: Tudiclidae; Cossmann, 1901

Synonyms
- Buccinulidae Finlay, 1928; Buccinulinae Finlay, 1928

Family of gastropods

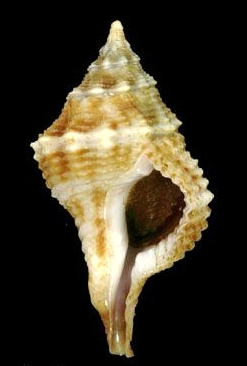
Afer afer shell from the Tudiclidae family

The Tudiclidae are taxonomic family in the superfamily Buccinoidea of large sea snails, often known as whelks and the like.

== General characteristics ==
The shells are moderate in size. The siphonal canal is slender and somewhat produced. The labial lip is either weakly denticulate, serrated, or sculptured with elongate denticles. The columella is denticulate either only anteriorly or along its entire length, and the parietal wall bears a single denticle in adult specimens. The radula of species of Buccinulum, Euthria, and Afrocominella is similar to that of Pisania, with both the rachidian and lateral teeth being tricuspid.

== Genera ==
- Aeneator H. J. Finlay, 1926
- Afer Conrad, 1858
- † Antarctissitys Stilwell & Zinsmeister, 2003
- † Boltenella Wade, 1917
- Buccinulum Deshayes, 1830
- † Cophocara R. B. Stewart, 1927
- Euthria Gray, 1850
- † Euthriofusus Cossmann, 1901
- Euthriostoma Marche-Marchad & Brébion, 1977
- Hercorhyncus Conrad, 1869
- † Heteroterma Gabb, 1869
- Lirabuccinum Vermeij, 1991
- † Nekewis R. B. Stewart, 1927
- † Rapopsis Saul, 1988 †
- Siphonofusus Kuroda & Habe, 1954
- Tasmeuthria Iredale, 1925
- Tudicla Röding, 1798
- † Tudiclana Finlay & Marwick, 1937

Synonyms

- † Brucia Cossmann, 1920 †: synonym of † Haplovoluta Wade, 1918 (objective synonym)
- † Ellicea Finlay, 1928: synonym of Aeneator (Ellicea) H. J. Finlay, 1928: synonym of Aeneator H. J. Finlay, 1926
- Euthrena Iredale, 1918: synonym of Buccinulum (Euthrena) Iredale, 1918: synonym of Buccinulum Deshayes, 1830 (synonym)
- Evarne H. Adams & A. Adams, 1853: synonym of Buccinulum Deshayes, 1830
- Evarnula Finlay, 1926: synonym of Buccinulum Deshayes, 1830
- † Haplovoluta Wade, 1918: synonym of † Hercorhyncus (Haplovoluta) Wade, 1918 † represented as † Hercorhyncus Conrad, 1869 (superseded rank)
- † Pittella Marwick, 1928: synonym of Aeneator H. J. Finlay, 1926
- Pyrella Swainson, 1835: synonym of Tudicla Röding, 1798 (objective synonym)
- † Scobina Wade, 1917: synonym of † Haplovoluta Wade, 1918 (invalid: junior homonym of Scobina Lepeletier, 1825 [Hymenoptera]; Haplovoluta and Brucia are replacement names)
- Spirillus Schlüter, 1838: synonym of Tudicla Röding, 1798 (objective synonym)
- Streptosiphon Gill, 1867: synonym of Afer Conrad, 1858
- Subfamily Tudiclinae Cossmann, 1901 (original rank)
- Tudicula de Ryckholt, 1862: synonym of Tudicla Röding, 1798 (unjustified emendation)

Cladogram of Austrosiphonidae and Tudiclidae

- - - Antarctoneptunea
    - Kelletia
    - Penion
    - Serratifusus
- - Aeneator
  - Buccinulum
  - Euthria
  - Tasmeuthria
