= Penion affixus =

Penion affixus Temporal range: Early Miocene, 18.7–15.9 Ma

Scientific classification
- Kingdom: Animalia
- Phylum: Mollusca
- Class: Gastropoda
- Subclass: Caenogastropoda
- Order: Neogastropoda
- Family: Austrosiphonidae
- Genus: Penion
- Species: †P. affixus

Binomial name
- †Penion affixus (Finlay, 1930)

Synonyms
- † Verconella affixa Finlay, 1930

Extinct species of gastropod

Penion affixus is an extinct species of marine snail or whelk, belonging to the true whelk family Austrosiphonidae.

== Description ==
The length of the shell attains 34 mm, its diameter 19 mm.

(Original description) This shell is closely related to the Recent Penion sulcatus (Lamarck, 1816), characterised by almost straight whorls and strong coarse spirals. Keel lower down than in any other species, practically at suture so that tubercles are just visible on spire whorls, which are almost straight, the spire itself having a faintly concave outline. Spirals strong and very irregular, like those of P. sulcatus in being narrow and raised, but not quite so strong, and still more irregular in disposition; not like the flat cords of marwicki, the difference being especially noticeable on periphery. Axials like those of P. marwicki but straight, not convex. Numerous lirae well within aperture. The periphery is more carinate and the siphonal canal shorter than in P. marwicki. The shell is apparently small, but probably not full grown.

The extinct species Penion exoptatus, Penion clifdenensis, and potentially also Penion marwicki, may belong to the same evolutionary lineage as the extant species Penion sulcatus. This hypothesis is based on geometric morphometric analysis of shell shape and size for all four taxa, as well as the analysis of morphometric variation exhibited all living species of Penion.

== Distribution ==
Fossils of Penion affixus are found in the Hutchinsonian strata at Clifden, New Zealand.
