= Penion interjunctus =

Penion interjunctus Temporal range: Early Miocene, 18.7–15.9 Ma

Scientific classification
- Kingdom: Animalia
- Phylum: Mollusca
- Class: Gastropoda
- Subclass: Caenogastropoda
- Order: Neogastropoda
- Family: Austrosiphonidae
- Genus: Penion
- Species: †P. interjunctus

Binomial name
- †Penion interjunctus (Finlay, 1930)

Synonyms
- † Verconella interjuncta Finlay, 1930

Extinct species of gastropod

Penion interjunctus is an extinct species of marine snail or whelk, belonging to the true whelk family Austrosiphonidae.

== Description ==
The length of the shell attains 55 mm (for the body whorl only), its diameter 35 mm.

(Original description) The shell appears intermediate in form between Penion marwicki and Penion asper (Marwick, 1928). It possesses the strong, regular spirals characteristic of P. asper, though it bears apparently more of them.

The shoulder is situated above the middle, although it is not quite as high as the shoulder found in P. asper (notably, the shoulder sits at the lower third in P. marwicki). Consequently, the axial ribs are much longer and more prominent on the spire whorls than those seen in P. marwicki. These ribs are much less tubercular, as they are hardly more raised on the periphery than elsewhere. Furthermore, the axials are positioned closer together than in P. marwicki—separated by about 1½ times their width—yet they are not so close as those in P. asper, where they are spaced at less than their own width apart.

In its other details, the shell is like P. marwicki

== Distribution ==
Fossils of Penion interjunctus are found in the Hutchinsonian strata at Clifden, New Zealand.
