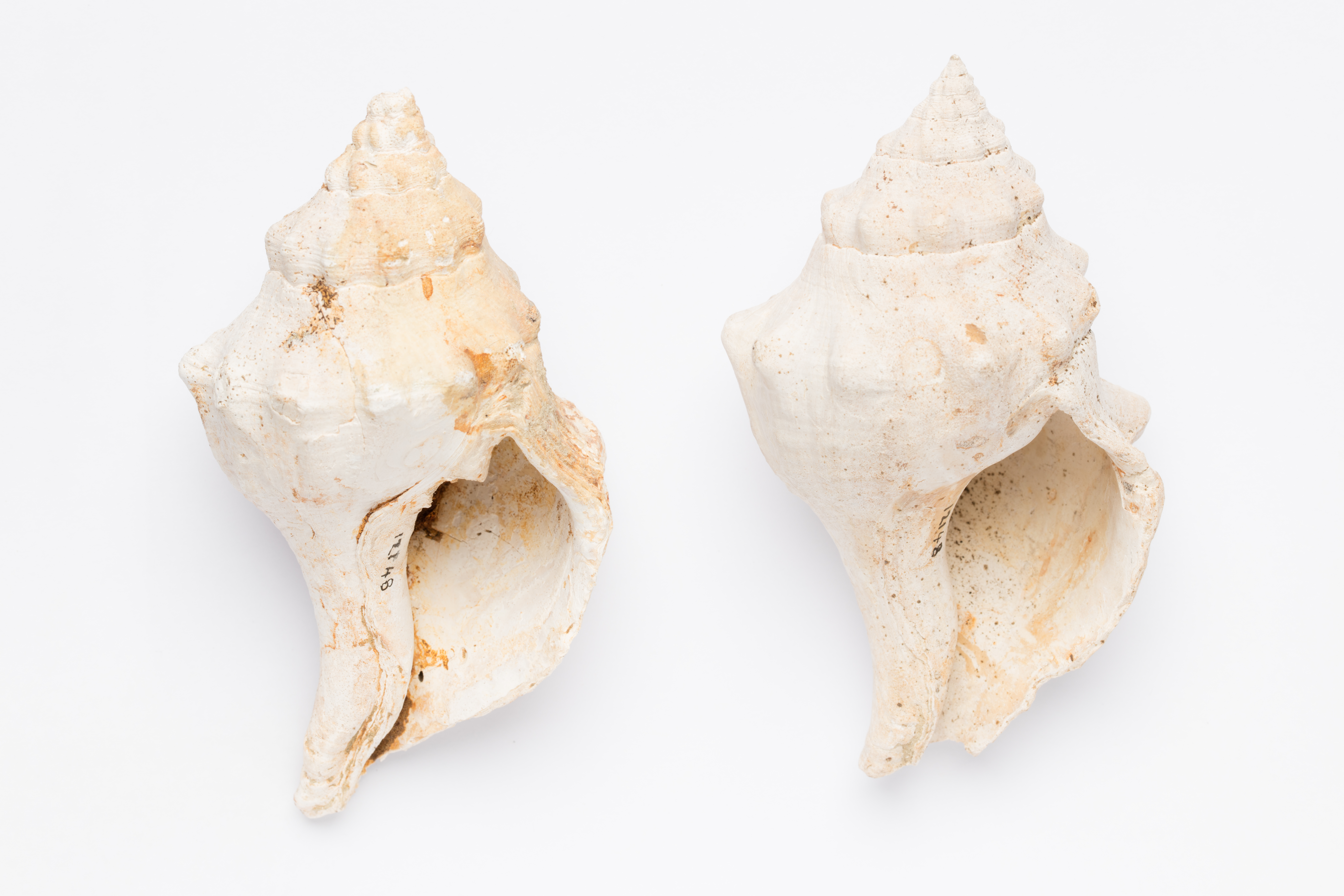
- Type specimen of Penion marwicki from the collections of Auckland War Memorial Museum

Scientific classification
- Kingdom: Animalia
- Phylum: Mollusca
- Class: Gastropoda
- Subclass: Caenogastropoda
- Order: Neogastropoda
- Family: Austrosiphonidae
- Genus: Penion
- Species: †P. marwicki

Binomial name
- †Penion marwicki (Finlay, 1930)

Synonyms
- † Verconella marwicki Finlay, 1930

= Penion marwicki =

Penion marwicki Temporal range: Early Miocene, 18.7–15.9 Ma

Extinct species of gastropod

Penion marwicki is an extinct species of marine snail or whelk, belonging to the true whelk family Austrosiphonidae.

== Description ==
The length of the shell attains 129 mm, its diameter 63 mm.

Penion marwicki is a large, extinct species of Penion siphon whelk.

(Original description) This shell is closely related to, and likely ancestral to, the Recent Penion sulcatus (Lamarck, 1816), though it reaches a larger size and appears more nodulous.

On the early whorls of P. sulcatus, the axials are significantly more numerous and closer together, typically separated by less than their own width. In P. marwicki, however, this configuration persists for only the first post-embryonic whorl. The ribs rapidly become strong and distant, spaced at about twice their width apart, which ensures that the closely costate appearance characteristic of adusta is quite absent.

The tubercles into which these ribs are raised are higher and more regularly shaped as bluntly conical forms; notably, they are not horizontally keeled by a peripheral rib. On the body whorl, these tubercles are prolonged downwards into rather narrowly raised ridges, which presents a profile quite different from the wide undulations seen in P. sulcatus.

The periphery is situated lower down, occurring on the lower third of the whorls instead of at the median point. Furthermore, the spirals are much lower and wider, being separated by almost linear grooves where a broad and a narrow groove alternate. There are no strong raised ridges present, such as those found in P. sulcatus.

The shoulder is found clasping further up on the previous whorl, and the aperture is perhaps a little longer. Most other details remain the same as in P. sulcatus. The color bands, as shown in a few specimens, are paired and relatively much wider and less numerous than those observed in adusta.

The extinct species Penion exoptatus, Penion clifdenensis, and potentially also Penion marwicki, may belong to the same evolutionary lineage as the extant species Penion sulcatus. This hypothesis is based on geometric morphometric analysis of shell shape and size for all four taxa, as well as the analysis of morphometric variation exhibited all living species of Penion.

== Distribution ==
Fossils of Penion marwicki are found in the South Island of New Zealand, and are relatively common at sites in North Otago and South Canterbury.
