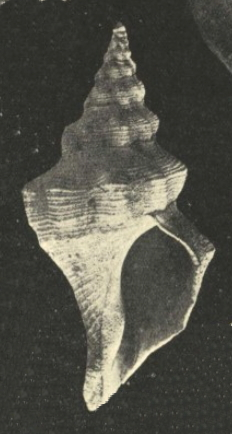
- Shell of Penion parans (holotype)

Scientific classification
- Kingdom: Animalia
- Phylum: Mollusca
- Class: Gastropoda
- Subclass: Caenogastropoda
- Order: Neogastropoda
- Family: Austrosiphonidae
- Genus: Penion
- Species: †P. parans

Binomial name
- †Penion parans (Finlay, 1930)

Synonyms
- † Verconella parans Finlay, 1930

= Penion parans =

Penion parans Temporal range: Early Miocene, 18.7–15.9 Ma

Extinct species of gastropod

Penion parans is an extinct species of marine snail or whelk, belonging to the true whelk family Austrosiphonidae.

== Description ==
The length of the shell attains 40 mm, its diameter 19.5 mm.

(Original description) This species is directly ancestral to Penion clifdenensis. The shell is notably more slender, the spire angle is considerably smaller, and the body whorl is not nearly so wide.

The spines are much smaller and less developed than in its descendant; they appear mostly as blunt tubercles situated on the axials and are hardly at all vertically compressed. The periphery is generally marked with two to three strong spirals instead of just one.

Furthermore, the periphery is submedian in position instead of being located near the lower suture. The siphonal canal is less bent to the left, and the fasciole is significantly weaker.

== Distribution ==
Fossils of Penion parans are found in the Hutchinsonian strata at Clifden, New Zealand.
