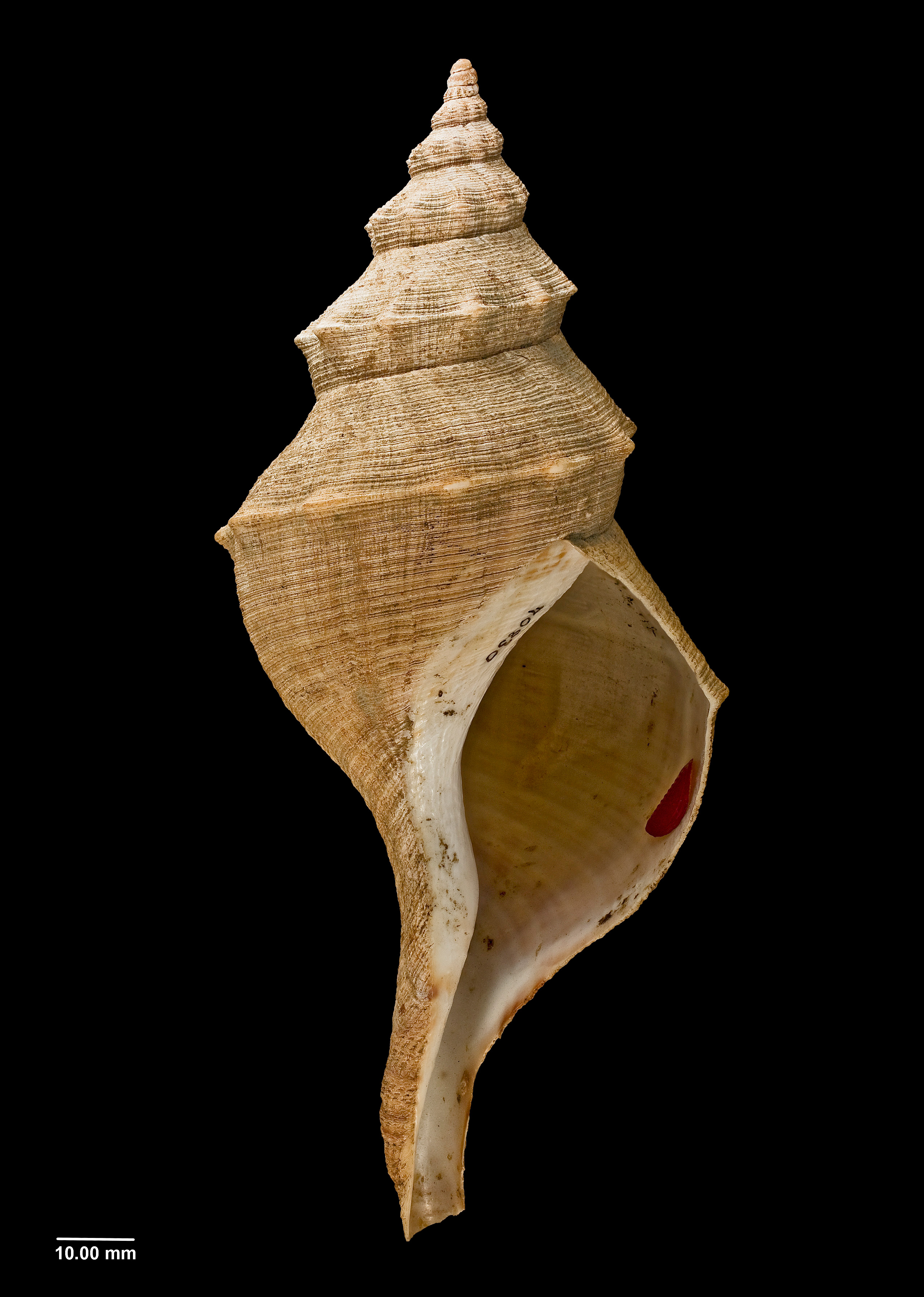
- Dorsal view of a shell of Penion cuvierianus

Scientific classification
- Kingdom: Animalia
- Phylum: Mollusca
- Class: Gastropoda
- Subclass: Caenogastropoda
- Order: Neogastropoda
- Family: Austrosiphonidae
- Genus: Penion
- Species: P. cuvierianus

Binomial name
- Penion cuvierianus (Powell, 1927)

Synonyms
- Megalatractus maximus Suter, 1913; Verconella dilatata rex Finlay, 1927; Verconella dilatata cuvieriana Iredale, 1914; Verconella dilatata var. elongata Powell, 1927; Verconella dilatata var. rotunda Powell, 1927; Verconella elongata Powell, 1927

= Penion cuvierianus =

Penion cuvierianus Temporal range: Early Pliocene to Recent, 1.63–0.0 Ma

Species of gastropod

Penion cuvierianus is a species of very large predatory sea snail or whelk, commonly called the flaring penion, a marine gastropod mollusc in the family Austrosiphonidae.

== Description ==
Penion cuvierianus is a very large species of siphon whelk. Shells vary between ivory and yellow in colouration.

(Original description of Verconella dilatata cuvieriana) It differs from Verconella dilatata (Quoy & Gaimard, 1833) (synonym of Penion sulcatus (Lamarck, 1816)) in being proportionately narrower and more robust in form. The peripheral nodules are strong but blunt, showing very little compression and lacking the sharp carina that characterizes the true V. dilatata. The periphery is distinctly angled, and the shoulder is slightly concave. In the adult specimen, the lip is not dilated.

The shell displays a buff coloration, with the interstices of the spiral sculpture obscurely lined with light brown. The aperture, the interior of the siphonal canal, and the parietal wall are porcellaneous white. Along the margin of the outer lip, small dark-brown blotches appear, caused by the interstitial color lines of the exterior showing through the callus.

The protoconch is damaged in both examined specimens. The operculum is horny, with a terminal nucleus positioned internally and surrounded by a whitish marginal callus typical of dilatata. It differs from that of the typical species in having a flattened upper outer slope, which forms an angle of approximately 52° with the axis, and in the nuclear pad on the inner surface, which is much less prominent.

The holotype measures 136 mm in height and 59 mm in diameter, while the paratype measures 150 mm in height and 67 mm in diameter.

Recent genetic and geometric morphometric research using shell shape and size has demonstrated that a formerly recognised subspecies Penion cuvierianus jeakingsi is closely related to Penion ormesi, instead of Penion curierianus, and the taxon has been synonymised with P. ormesi.

Variation in shell morphology
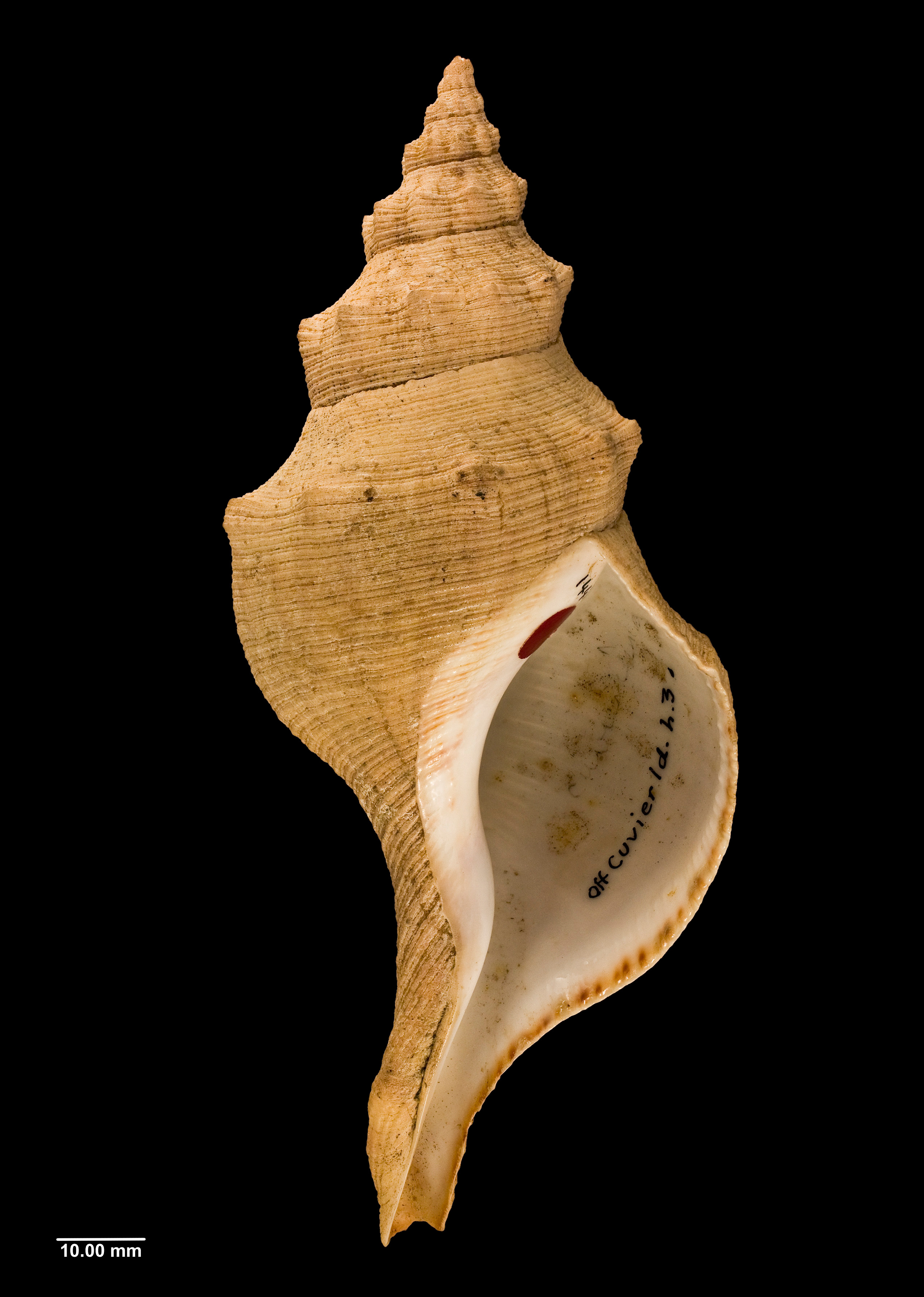
P. c. cuvierianus

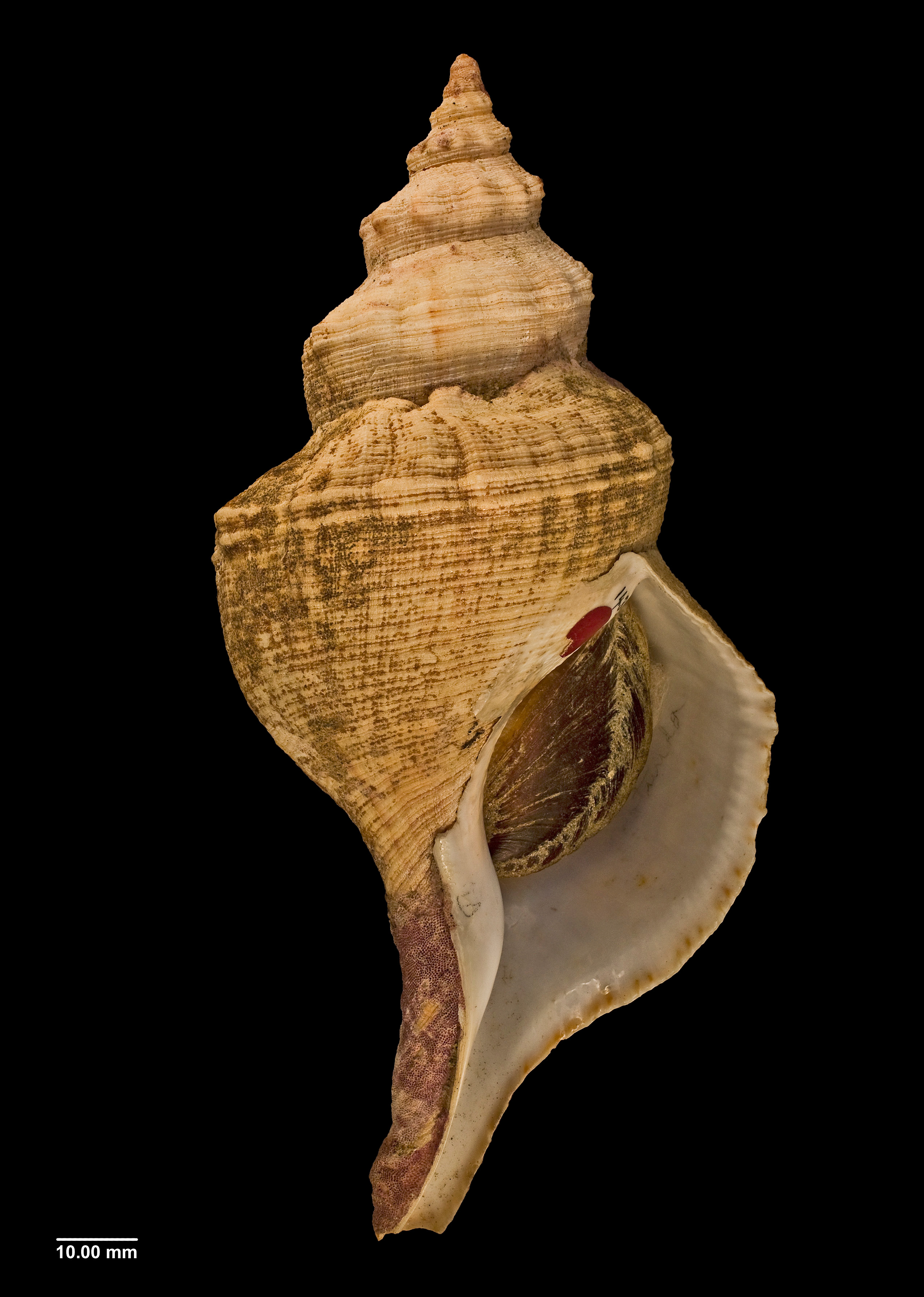
P. c. cuvierianus

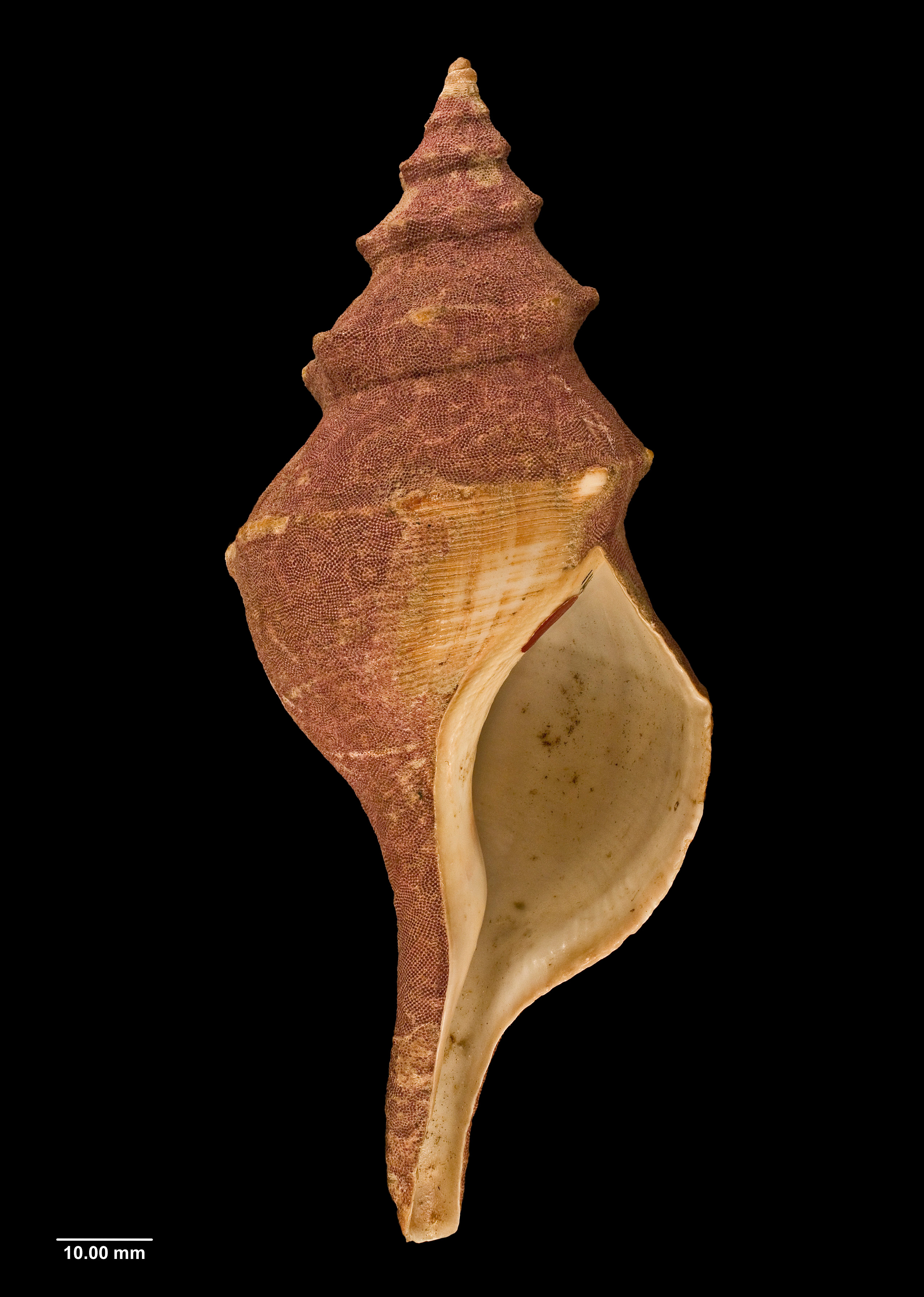
P. c. cuvierianus

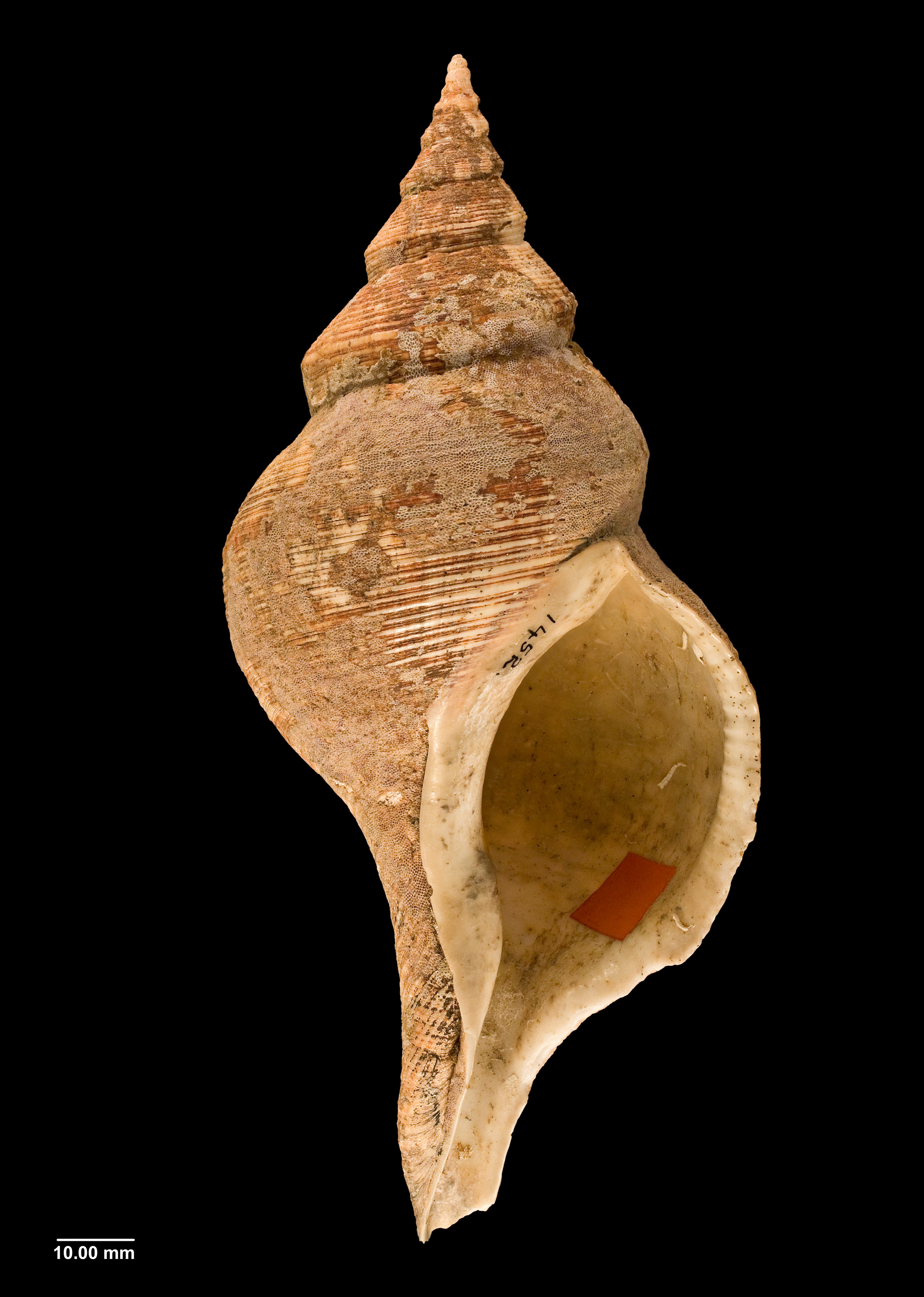
P. c.cuvierianus

== Distribution ==
Penion cuvierianus is endemic to New Zealand. The taxonomic name is a reference to the type locality of Cuvier Island. The species has an abundant fossil record in the North Island of New Zealand.

The species occurs in the subtidal zone between depths of 20 and 200 metres.

== Subspecies ==
These subspecies have been recognised:

- Penion cuvierianus cuvierianus (Powell, 1927)

=== Subspecies brought into synonymy ===
- Penion cuvierianus jeakingsi (Powell, 1947): synonym of Penion ormesi (Powell, 1927)
