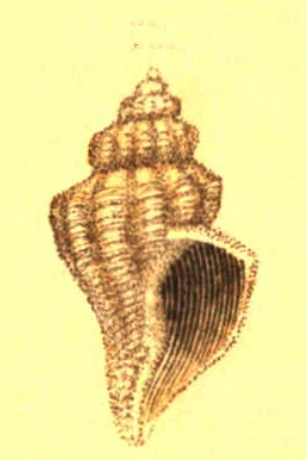
- Shell of Penion delabechii (holotype)

Scientific classification
- Kingdom: Animalia
- Phylum: Mollusca
- Class: Gastropoda
- Subclass: Caenogastropoda
- Order: Neogastropoda
- Family: Austrosiphonidae
- Genus: Penion
- Species: †P. delabechii

Binomial name
- †Penion delabechii (I. Lea, 1833)

= Penion delabechii =

Species of gastropod

Penion delabechii is an extinct species of very large predatory sea snail or whelk, a marine gastropod mollusc in the family Austrosiphonidae.

== Description ==
The shell reaches a length of 33.5 mm and a breadth of 7.6 mm.

(Original description) The shell is subfusiform in shape and is furnished with rather sharp longitudinal folds, which are cut by imbricate transverse striae. The substance of the shell is notably thick, supporting a spire that is somewhat elevated and acute at the apex.

The shell consists of seven subangular whorls, leading to a siphonal canal that is short and flexed. The aperture itself is subangular, while the outer lip is crenate and striate within.

== Distribution ==
Fossils of the species were found in Alabama, USA.
