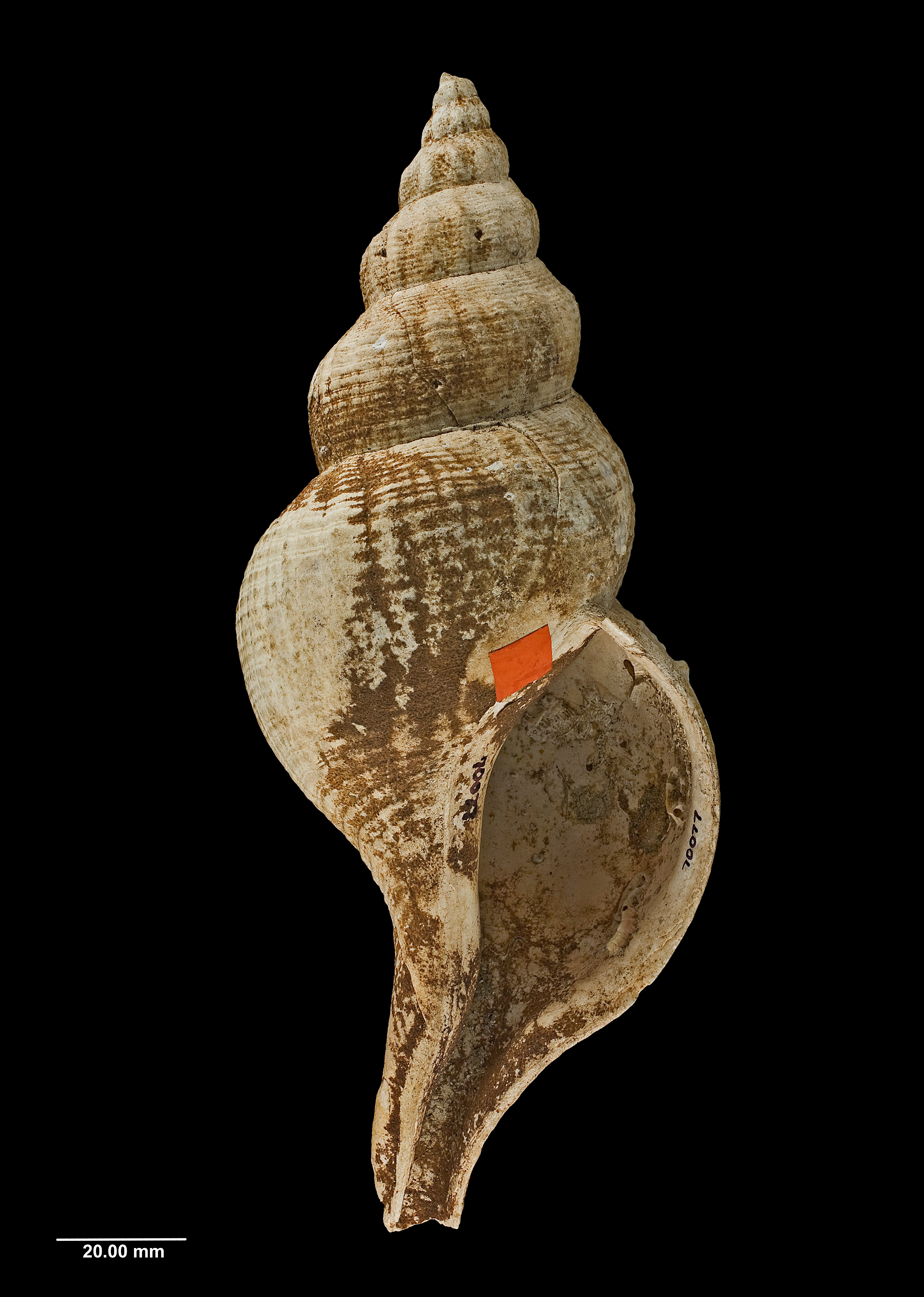
- A shell of Penion chathamensis

Scientific classification
- Kingdom: Animalia
- Phylum: Mollusca
- Class: Gastropoda
- Subclass: Caenogastropoda
- Order: Neogastropoda
- Family: Austrosiphonidae
- Genus: Penion
- Species: P. chathamensis

Binomial name
- Penion chathamensis (Powell, 1938)

Synonyms
- Austrosipho (Verconella) chathamensis A. W. B. Powell, 1938 (superseded combination); Penion fairfieldae (Powell, 1947); Verconella fairfieldae A. W. B. Powell, 1947 (junior subjective synonym)

= Penion chathamensis =

Species of gastropod

Penion chathamensis is a species of very large predatory sea snail or whelk, a marine gastropod mollusc in the family Austrosiphonidae.

== Description ==
The length of the shell attains 244 mm, its diameter 106 mm.

Penion chathamensis is a very large species of Penion siphon whelk. Although P. chathamensis has separate sexes, the species does not appear to exhibit secondary sexual dimorphism in shell shape or size.

A separate species, Penion fairfieldae was formerly recognised, but recent genetic data has demonstrated that the species is indistinguishable from Penion chathamensis. Shells originally recognised as P. fairfieldae can be distinguished from P. chathamensis using shell size, but not using shell shape.

== Distribution ==
Penion chathamensis is endemic to New Zealand. The species is distributed off of the west coast of the South Island, and occurs on Chatham Rise and in waters surrounding the Chatham Islands The latter location is the type locality, giving rise to the binomial name of the species.
