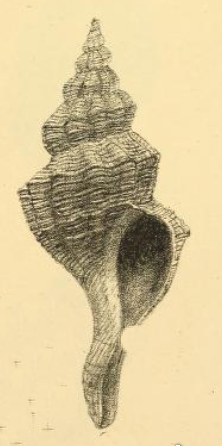
- Shell of Penion longirostris (holotype)

Scientific classification
- Kingdom: Animalia
- Phylum: Mollusca
- Class: Gastropoda
- Subclass: Caenogastropoda
- Order: Neogastropoda
- Superfamily: Buccinoidea
- Family: Austrosiphonidae
- Genus: Penion
- Species: †P. longirostris

Binomial name
- †Penion longirostris (Tate, 1888)

Synonyms
- † Siphonalia longirostris Tate, 1888 superseded combination; not Dunker, 1882 (homonym)

= Penion longirostris =

Species of gastropod

Penion longirostris is an extinct species of medium-sized marine snail or whelk, belonging to the true whelk family Austrosiphonidae.

== Description ==
The shell reaches a length of 69 mm and a diameter of 27 mm; the combined length of the aperture and siphonal canal is 40 mm, while the diameter of the aperture measures 11 mm

(Original description) The shell is elongate-fusiform in shape and features a high, subscalar spire that ends in a small, mamillate apex composed of one and a half smooth, convex whorls. There are nine whorls in total, which range in form from convex to subangulated.

These whorls are furnished with transverse costae, which are reduced to somewhat sharp tubercles, as well as subacute spiral threads that appear alternately large and small. This entire structure is crossed by subdistant lamellae. On the body whorl, there are eleven tubercles, while the penultimate whorl possesses approximately eleven strong spiral threads.

The aperture is elongately pyriform, and the outer lip is thin and internally sulcated. The siphonal canal is notably elongate and much twisted.

== Distribution ==
Fossils of Penion longirostris were found in Tertiary strata in Victoria, Australia.
