= Penion subreflexus =

Scientific classification
- Kingdom: Animalia
- Phylum: Mollusca
- Class: Gastropoda
- Subclass: Caenogastropoda
- Order: Neogastropoda
- Family: Austrosiphonidae
- Genus: Penion
- Species: †P. subreflexus

Binomial name
- †Penion subreflexus (Sowerby I, 1846)

Synonyms
- † Fusus striatonodosus Hupé, 1854 junior subjective synonym; † Fusus subreflexus G. B. Sowerby I, 1846 superseded combination

Extinct species of gastropod

Penion subreflexus is an extinct species of marine snail or whelk, belonging to the true whelk family Austrosiphonidae.

== Description ==
(Original description in Latin) The shell is fusiform-turreted and is transversely striated with irregular striae. It is composed of nine whorls, which are tuberculated in the middle and somewhat appressed near the sutures. The siphonal canal is of moderate length and is slightly reflexed.

== Distribution ==
Fossils of Penion subreflexus were found in Miocene strata at Navidad, Chile
