= Penion finlayi =

Penion finlayi Temporal range: Early Miocene, 18.7–15.9 Ma

Scientific classification
- Kingdom: Animalia
- Phylum: Mollusca
- Class: Gastropoda
- Subclass: Caenogastropoda
- Order: Neogastropoda
- Family: Austrosiphonidae
- Genus: Penion
- Species: †P. finlayi

Binomial name
- †Penion finlayi (Laws, 1930) †

Synonyms
- † Verconella finlayi Laws, 1930 (superseded combination)

Extinct species of gastropod

Penion finlayi is an extinct species of marine snail or whelk, belonging to the true whelk family Austrosiphonidae.

== Distribution ==
Fossils of Penion finlayi were found in Kaawa Creek or Pakaurangi Point, New Zealand.
