= Penion subregularis =

Scientific classification
- Kingdom: Animalia
- Phylum: Mollusca
- Class: Gastropoda
- Subclass: Caenogastropoda
- Order: Neogastropoda
- Family: Austrosiphonidae
- Genus: Penion
- Species: †P. subregularis

Binomial name
- †Penion subregularis (A. d'Orbigny, 1852)

Synonyms
- † Fusus darwinianus R. A. Philippi, 1887 junior objective synonym (unnecessary replacement name); † Fusus regularis G. B. Sowerby I, 1846 junior homonym (junior primary homonym of F....); † Fusus subregularis (A. d'Orbigny, 1852) (superseded combination)

Extinct species of gastropod

Penion subregularis is an extinct species of marine snail or whelk, belonging to the true whelk family Austrosiphonidae.

== Distribution ==
Fossils of Penion subregularis were found in Navidad, Chile
