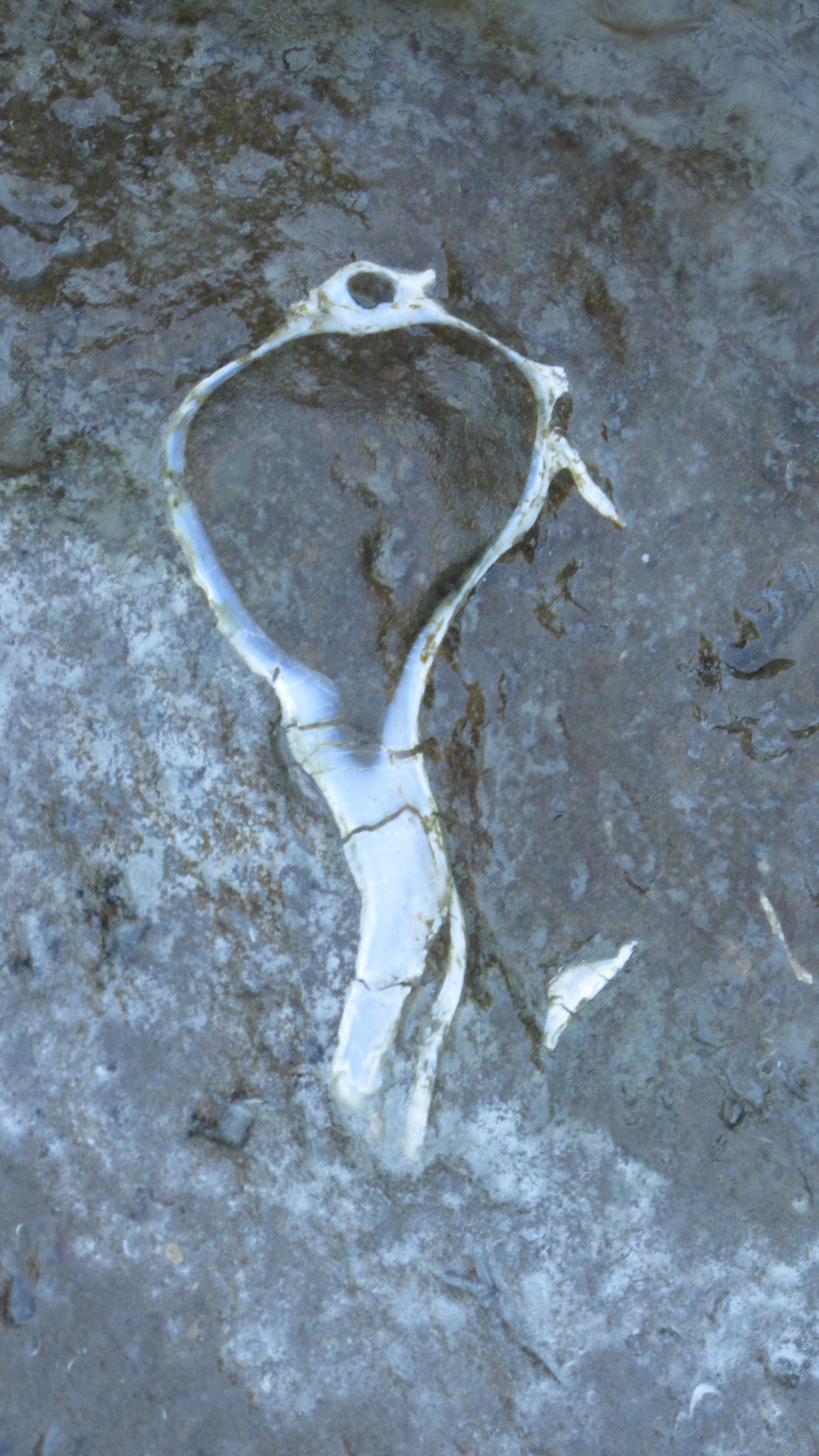
- An embedded fossil of Penion crawfordi at Cape Palliser, New Zealand.

Scientific classification
- Kingdom: Animalia
- Phylum: Mollusca
- Class: Gastropoda
- Subclass: Caenogastropoda
- Order: Neogastropoda
- Family: Austrosiphonidae
- Genus: Penion
- Species: †P. crawfordi

Binomial name
- †Penion crawfordi (Hutton, 1873)

Synonyms
- Fusus crawfordi Hutton, 1873; Austrosipho (Verconella) latispinifer Marwick, 1932; Austrosipho masoni Fleming, 1943; Austrosipho takapauensis Fleming, 1943; Murex crawfordi Hutton, 1873; Verconella crawfordi Hutton, 1873; Austrosipho (Verconella) crawfordi Hutton, 1873; Verconella latispinifer Marwick, 1932

= Penion crawfordi =

Penion crawfordi Temporal range: Middle to Late Miocene, 15.9–7.2 Ma

Extinct species of gastropod

Penion crawfordi is an extinct species of marine snail or whelk, belonging to the true whelk family Austrosiphonidae.

== Description ==
Penion crawfordi is a large, extinct species of Penion siphon whelk. Shells of P. crawfordi have spine-like, dorso-ventrally compressed nodules on the shell spire.

(Original description) The shell is ovato-fusiform in shape and is distantly marked by spirally striated patterns. It consists of five whorls, where those of the spire appear distinctly flattened. Each of these spire whorls bears a row of tubercles located near the anterior suture, though this feature is largely covered up by the subsequent ventral whorl.

The body whorl is notably inflated and keeled, featuring a prominent row of nine large tubercles situated directly on the keel. Positioned just in front of them is a similar row of smaller tubercles. The aperture is oval in form, leading into what appears to be a short siphonal canal.

== Distribution ==
Fossils of Penion crawfordi are found in northern South Island and southern North Island in New Zealand.
