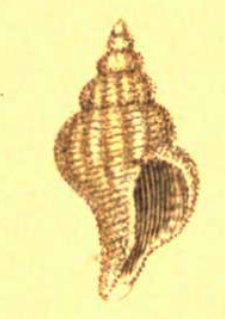
- Shell of Penion crebissimus (holotype)

Scientific classification
- Kingdom: Animalia
- Phylum: Mollusca
- Class: Gastropoda
- Subclass: Caenogastropoda
- Order: Neogastropoda
- Family: Austrosiphonidae
- Genus: Penion
- Species: †P. crebissimus

Binomial name
- †Penion crebissimus (I. Lea, 1833)

Synonyms
- † Fusus crebissimus I. Lea, 1833 superseded combination; Penion crebrissimus [sic] incorrect subsequent spelling

= Penion crebissimus =

Species of gastropod

Penion crebissimus is an extinct species of very large predatory sea snail or whelk, a marine gastropod mollusc in the family Austrosiphonidae.

== Description ==
The shell measures approximately 12.7 mm in length and 5.1 mm in breadth.

(Original description) The shell is subfusiform in shape and is furnished with longitudinal folds that are intersected by rather coarse, very closely set transverse striae. Its substance is thick and solid, and the spire is moderately elevated. The shell consists of seven convex whorls. The siphonal canal is relatively short, and the aperture is subrotund in form. The outer lip is finely crenate along its edge and bears small dentations within.

This species is particularly remarkable for the transverse striae, which are densely and uniformly distributed over the entire surface of the shell. In some specimens, these striae become somewhat rough and exhibit a slightly imbricated appearance.

== Distribution ==
Fossils of the species were found in Alabama, USA.
