= Penion winthropi =

Scientific classification
- Kingdom: Animalia
- Phylum: Mollusca
- Class: Gastropoda
- Subclass: Caenogastropoda
- Order: Neogastropoda
- Family: Austrosiphonidae
- Genus: Penion
- Species: †P. winthropi

Binomial name
- †Penion winthropi (Finlay, 1930)

Extinct species of gastropod

Penion winthropi is an extinct species of marine snail or whelk, belonging to the true whelk family Austrosiphonidae.

== Distribution ==
Fossils of Penion affixus are found in the Upper Cenozoic strata of Wairoa District, New Zealand.
