= Penion gauli =

Penion gauli Temporal range: Early Miocene, 18.7–15.9 Ma

Scientific classification
- Kingdom: Animalia
- Phylum: Mollusca
- Class: Gastropoda
- Subclass: Caenogastropoda
- Order: Neogastropoda
- Family: Austrosiphonidae
- Genus: Penion
- Species: †P. gauli

Binomial name
- †Penion gauli (Marwick, 1948)

Synonyms
- † Verconella gauli Marwick, 1948 (superseded combination)

Extinct species of gastropod

Penion gauli is an extinct species of marine snail or whelk, belonging to the true whelk family Austrosiphonidae.

== Distribution ==
Fossils of Penion gauli were found off Otahuhu, Auckland, New Zealand.
