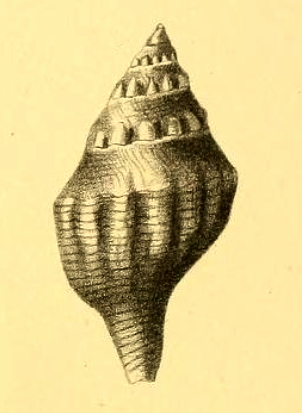
- Shell of Penion macsporrani (holotype)

Scientific classification
- Kingdom: Animalia
- Phylum: Mollusca
- Class: Gastropoda
- Subclass: Caenogastropoda
- Order: Neogastropoda
- Family: Austrosiphonidae
- Genus: Penion
- Species: †P. macsporrani

Binomial name
- †Penion macsporrani (R. A. Philippi, 1887)

Synonyms
- † Fusus macsporrani R. A. Philippi, 1887 superseded combination

= Penion macsporrani =

Species of gastropod

Penion macsporrani is an extinct species of very large predatory sea snail or whelk, commonly called the flaring penion, a marine gastropod mollusc in the family Austrosiphonidae.

== Description ==
The holotype measures 51 mm in height and 25 mm in diameter.

(Original description in Latin) The shell is ovato-fusiform in shape, transversely lirate, and relatively smooth, being furnished with node-bearing ribs. These nodes are short on the anterior part of the upper whorls, situated next to the suture, but they become elongated in the middle of the body whorl.

The aperture, when combined with the siphonal canal, equals three-fifths of the total height. The siphonal notch is straight and rather short, and the lip is notably callous.

== Distribution ==
Fossils of this species were found in the Navidad Formation in Chile.
