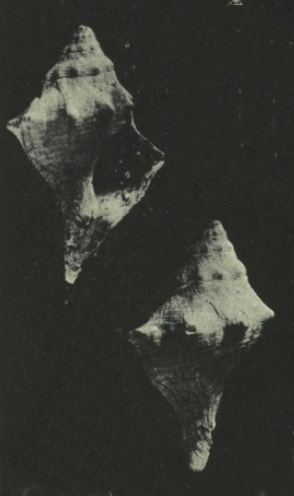
- Shell of Penion koruahinensis (holotype)

Scientific classification
- Kingdom: Animalia
- Phylum: Mollusca
- Class: Gastropoda
- Subclass: Caenogastropoda
- Order: Neogastropoda
- Family: Austrosiphonidae
- Genus: Penion
- Species: †P. koruahinensis

Binomial name
- †Penion koruahinensis (Bartrum & A. W. B. Powell, 1928)

Synonyms
- † Verconella koruahinensis Bartrum & A. W. B. Powell, 1928 (superseded combination)

= Penion koruahinensis =

Penion koruahinensis Temporal range: Early Miocene, 18.7–15.9 Ma

Extinct species of gastropod

Penion koruahinensis is an extinct species of marine snail or whelk, belonging to the true whelk family Austrosiphonidae.

== Description ==
The dimensions of the holotype, despite the broken apex, include a height of 71.4 mm and an approximate diameter of 36.5 mm.

(Original description) The shell is fairly large and fusiform in shape, featuring a conical spire that measures half the height of the aperture and siphonal canal. The body whorl possesses a rounded shoulder-angle that bears rather distant, rounded nodules, which are also present on the spire whorls. These nodules increase regularly in size and become almost spinose on the body whorl; notably, they lack the connecting carina that is present in Penion sulcatus.

The axial ribs are only faintly developed. While the aperture, columella, inner lip, and anterior canal are formed as they are in P. sulcatus, the columella in this specimen is broken below. The outer lip is thin and is not crenulate like that of P. sulcatus, a difference owing to the finer sculpture of this species. The posterior canal is narrow, as the shoulder of the body whorl is appressed toward the suture. Consequently, the suture itself is appressed and somewhat deep, appearing undulating because of its position immediately below the nodular carina.

The ornamentation consists of numerous spiral lirae, which are very much finer than those found in P. sulcatus. These are accompanied by intervening, even finer secondary threads that vary in number from one to five; typically, there is one thread on the spire whorls and four or five on the body whorl.

== Distribution ==
Fossils of Penion koruahinensis were found off Kaawa Creek, New Zealand.
