= Penion lineatus =

Scientific classification
- Kingdom: Animalia
- Phylum: Mollusca
- Class: Gastropoda
- Subclass: Caenogastropoda
- Order: Neogastropoda
- Superfamily: Buccinoidea
- Family: Austrosiphonidae
- Genus: Penion
- Species: P. lineatus

Binomial name
- Penion lineatus B.A. Marshall, Hills & Vaux, 2018

Species of gastropod

Penion lineatus is a species of medium-sized marine snail or whelk, belonging to the true whelk family Austrosiphonidae. It was described in 2018.

== Description ==
Adult shells are between 68 mm and 172 mm in length. The shell protoconch is cream coloured and the teleoconch is covered in yellow or brown bands.

== Distribution ==
Penion lineatus is endemic to waters surrounding the Three Kings Islands and Cape Reinga north of mainland New Zealand. Since the species has a naturally restricted geographic range, its conservation status within the New Zealand Threat Classification System has been categorised as at risk and naturally uncommon by the Department of Conservation.
