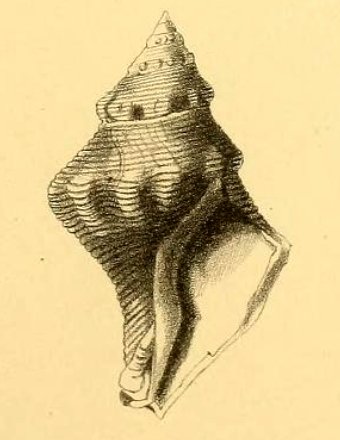
- Shell of Penion domeykoanus (holotype)

Scientific classification
- Kingdom: Animalia
- Phylum: Mollusca
- Class: Gastropoda
- Subclass: Caenogastropoda
- Order: Neogastropoda
- Family: Austrosiphonidae
- Genus: Penion
- Species: †P. domeykoanus

Binomial name
- †Penion domeykoanus (R. A. Philippi, 1887)

Synonyms
- † Fusus domeykoanus R. A. Philippi, 1887 superseded combination

= Penion domeykoanus =

Species of gastropod

Penion domeykoanus is an extinct species of very large predatory sea snail or whelk, commonly called the flaring penion, a marine gastropod mollusc in the family Austrosiphonidae.

== Description ==
The holotype measures 54 mm in height and 35 mm in diameter.

(Original description in Latin) The shell is ovato-oblong and biconic in shape, being noduliferous and irregularly, densely, and strongly lirate. The nodes are acute and very prominent, numbering nine to ten on each whorl; on the posterior whorls, they are situated slightly behind the suture.

The body whorl is nearly twice as long as the spire. The aperture is suborbicular and slightly channeled at the upper end, while the siphonal canal is equal in length to the aperture. The siphonal notch is slightly recurved.

== Distribution ==
Fossils of this species were found in the Navidad Formation in Chile.
