= Penion huttoni =

Penion huttoni Temporal range: Early Miocene, 18.7–15.9 Ma

Scientific classification
- Kingdom: Animalia
- Phylum: Mollusca
- Class: Gastropoda
- Subclass: Caenogastropoda
- Order: Neogastropoda
- Family: Austrosiphonidae
- Genus: Penion
- Species: †P. huttoni

Binomial name
- †Penion huttoni (L. C. King, 1934)

Synonyms
- † Austrosipho huttoni L. C. King, 1934 (superseded combination)

Extinct species of gastropod

Penion huttoni is an extinct species of marine snail or whelk, belonging to the true whelk family Austrosiphonidae.

== Distribution ==
Fossils of Penion huttoni were found off lower Awatere district, Marlborough, New Zealand.
