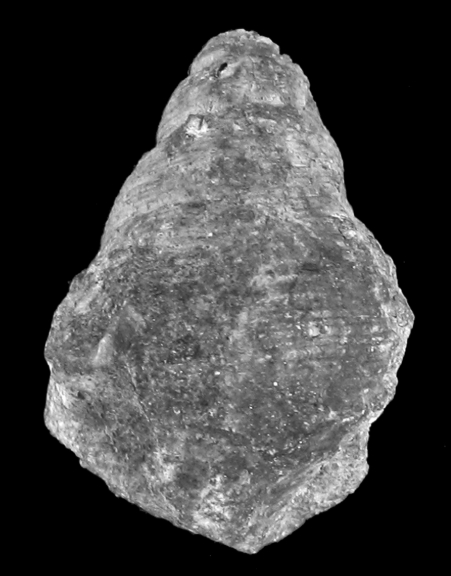
- Shell of Penion petitianus (syntype at MNHN, Paris)

Scientific classification
- Kingdom: Animalia
- Phylum: Mollusca
- Class: Gastropoda
- Subclass: Caenogastropoda
- Order: Neogastropoda
- Family: Austrosiphonidae
- Genus: Penion
- Species: †P. petitianus

Binomial name
- †Penion petitianus (A. d'Orbigny, 1841)

Synonyms
- † Fusus petitianus A. d'Orbigny, 1841 superseded combination

= Penion petitianus =

Extinct species of gastropod

Penion petitianus is an extinct species of marine snail or whelk, belonging to the true whelk family Austrosiphonidae.

== Description ==
(Original description in Latin and French) The shell is elongated. The whorls are slightly convex and are longitudinally striated; these striae (fine grooves) are unequal in size, and the siphonal canal is short.

The dimensions of the shell include a spiral angle opening of 52°, a total length of 70 mm, and a width of 34 mm.

The shell is moderately elongated and thick. The spire is formed by a regular angle and is composed of whorls that are slightly convex and quite distinct. These whorls are furnished longitudinally with unequal striae, and the siphonal canal is moderate in its development.

== Distribution ==
Fossils of Penion petitianus have been found in Miocene strata at Coquimbo, Chile.
