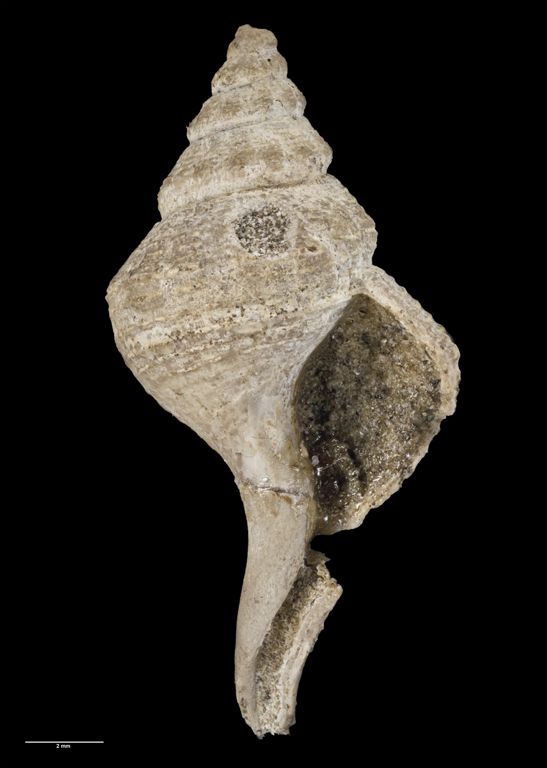

Scientific classification
- Kingdom: Animalia
- Phylum: Mollusca
- Class: Gastropoda
- Subclass: Caenogastropoda
- Order: Neogastropoda
- Family: Austrosiphonidae
- Genus: Penion
- Species: P. proavitus

Binomial name
- Penion proavitus (Finlay & Marwick, 1937)

Synonyms
- Verconella proavita Finlay & Marwick, 1937

= Penion proavitus =

Penion proavitus Temporal range: Paleocene, 66–56 Ma

Extinct species of gastropod

Penion proavitus is an extinct species of marine snail or whelk, belonging to the true whelk family Austrosiphonidae.

== Description ==
Penion proavitus fossils are the earliest known specimens of Penion siphon whelks. The species was medium-to-large in size.

It is possible that fossils of Penion proavitus represent a stem lineage that was the common ancestor of Penion, Kelletia and Antarctoneptunea, instead of a species of Penion itself.

== Distribution ==
Fossils of Penion proavitus are found in New Zealand's South Island. The species lived in the seas surrounding Zealandia between 56 and 66 million million years ago (Teurian stage).
