= Penion subrectus =

Scientific classification
- Kingdom: Animalia
- Phylum: Mollusca
- Class: Gastropoda
- Subclass: Caenogastropoda
- Order: Neogastropoda
- Family: Austrosiphonidae
- Genus: Penion
- Species: †P. subrectus

Binomial name
- †Penion subrectus Ihering, 1899) †

Synonyms
- † Siphonalia dilatata var. subrecta Ihering, 1899 superseded combination

Extinct species of gastropod

Penion subrectus is an extinct species of marine snail or whelk, belonging to the true whelk family Austrosiphonidae.

== Distribution ==
Fossils of Penion subrectus were found in Patagonia.
