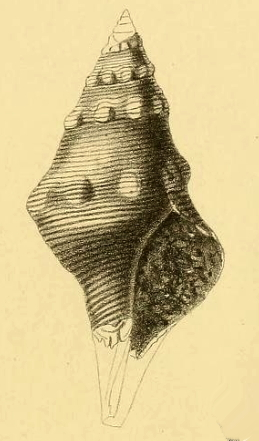
- Shell of Penion oncodes (holotype)

Scientific classification
- Kingdom: Animalia
- Phylum: Mollusca
- Class: Gastropoda
- Subclass: Caenogastropoda
- Order: Neogastropoda
- Family: Austrosiphonidae
- Genus: Penion
- Species: †P. oncodes

Binomial name
- †Penion oncodes (R. A. Philippi, 1887)

Synonyms
- † Fusus oncodes R. A. Philippi, 1887 superseded combination

= Penion oncodes =

Species of gastropod

Penion oncodes is an extinct species of very large predatory sea snail or whelk, commonly called the flaring penion, a marine gastropod mollusc in the family Austrosiphonidae.

== Description ==
The holotype measures 75 mm in height and 33 mm in diameter.

(Original description in Latin) The shell is oblong-fusiform and solid, being transversely marked with striate furrows. The whorls are sloping at the posterior, and they are often nodulous at the very suture.

The body whorl is nodose over about a fourth part of its surface and appears nearly biconic. There are approximately eight to nine obtuse nodes present on each whorl.

== Distribution ==
Fossils of this species were found in the Navidad Formation in Chile.
