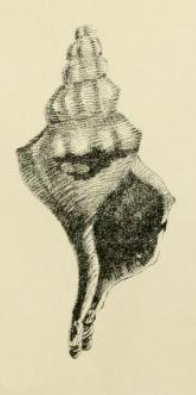
- Shell of Penion roblini (holotype)

Scientific classification
- Kingdom: Animalia
- Phylum: Mollusca
- Class: Gastropoda
- Subclass: Caenogastropoda
- Order: Neogastropoda
- Family: Austrosiphonidae
- Genus: Penion
- Species: †P. roblini

Binomial name
- †Penion roblini (Tenison Woods, 1876)

Synonyms
- † Austrosipho roblini (Tenison Woods, 1876) (superseded combination); † Fusus roblini Tenison Woods, 1876 (superseded combination)

= Penion roblini =

Extinct species of gastropod

Penion roblini is an extinct species of marine snail or whelk, belonging to the true whelk family Austrosiphonidae.

Subspecies:

- † Penion roblini roblini (Tenison Woods, 1876)
- † Penion roblini simulans (Tate, 1888)

== Description ==
(Original description) The shell is twisted and fusiform in shape, consisting of seven whorls that are finely spirally sulcate and striate. A row of sub-distant, somewhat sharp tubercles is situated on the outer sloping margin, where the whorl is angulated. There are thirteen of these tubercles present on the body whorl. The aperture is elongately pyriform, while the columella (is twisted and the siphonal canal is recurved.

== Distribution ==
Fossils of Penion proavitus are found in Tertiary strata on Tasmania.
