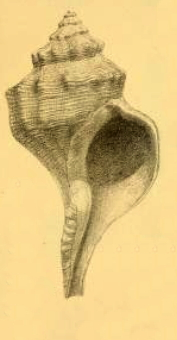
- Shell of Penion spatiosus (holotype)

Scientific classification
- Kingdom: Animalia
- Phylum: Mollusca
- Class: Gastropoda
- Subclass: Caenogastropoda
- Order: Neogastropoda
- Superfamily: Buccinoidea
- Family: Austrosiphonidae
- Genus: Penion
- Species: †P. spatiosus

Binomial name
- †Penion spatiosus (Tate, 1888)

Synonyms
- † Fusus henicus Tate, 1889 junior subjective synonym; † Siphonalia spatiosa Tate, 1888

= Penion spatiosus =

Species of gastropod

Penion spatiosus is an extinct species of medium-sized marine snail or whelk, belonging to the true whelk family Austrosiphonidae.

== Description ==
The shell reaches a length of 98 mm and a diameter of 48 mm, with the aperture and the siphonal canal together measuring 73 mm in length.

(Original description) The shell is somewhat elongately pyriform in shape and consists of six whorls, though the apex is wanting in this specimen. The posterior whorls appear flat or slightly convex, featuring a row of nodulations situated at the anterior suture. In contrast, the anterior whorls are tabulate; their posterior slope is very wide and upwardly inclined, while the anterior slope is narrow, contracted at the suture, and roundly plicated. These plicae terminate at the keel in a series of obtuse nodulations.

The body whorl is ventricose in the middle and slopes slightly from the keel for a distance equal to the length of the posterior slope. From that point, it is suddenly contracted into a long, rather wide siphonal canal that is curved and slightly reverted. The transverse plications do not extend onto the base and are notably absent from the anterior-fourth of the whorl; there are fourteen nodulations present on this body whorl.

The whole surface is furnished with crowded, depressed, and rounded spiral threads that are alternately large and small. These threads are crossed by curved lines and striae of growth, which obscurely crenulate the lirae.

The aperture is large and oval, with an outer lip that is slightly dilated anteriorly and slightly ascending posteriorly, remaining smooth within. The inner lip spreads widely over the columella and is decurrent on the inner face of the siphonal canal, while the columella itself is slightly concave above the pillar (the base of the columellar wall).

== Distribution ==
Fossils of Penion spatiosus were found in Tertiary strata in Victoria, Australia.
