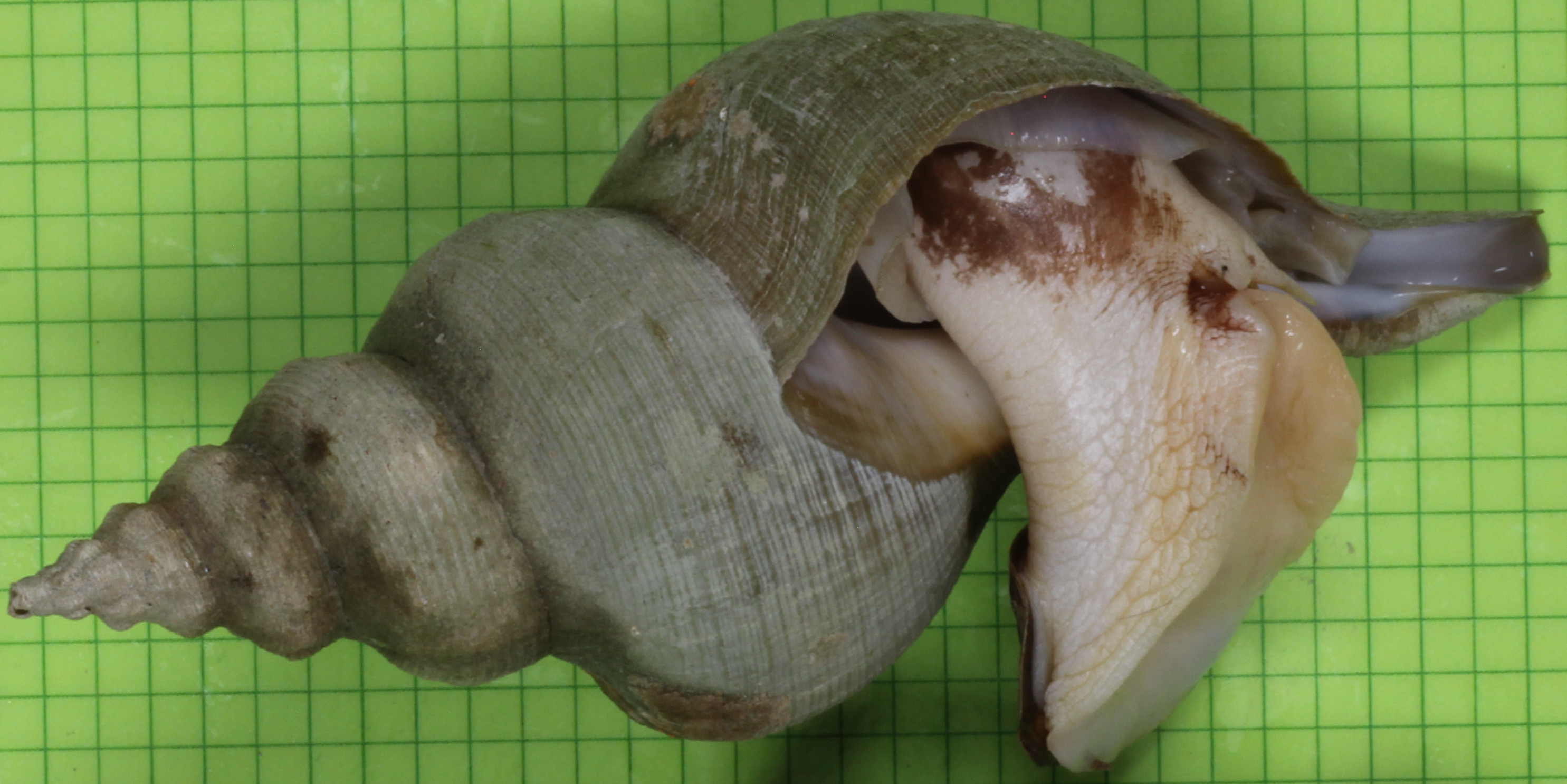
- Penion ormesi snail collected from Golden Bay in New Zealand

Scientific classification
- Kingdom: Animalia
- Phylum: Mollusca
- Class: Gastropoda
- Subclass: Caenogastropoda
- Order: Neogastropoda
- Family: Austrosiphonidae
- Genus: Penion
- Species: P. ormesi

Binomial name
- Penion ormesi (Powell A W B, 1927)

Synonyms
- Penion cuvierianus jeakingsi A. W. B. Powell, 1947); Verconella dispar A. W. B. Powell, 1927; Verconella jeakingsi A. W. B. Powell, 1947 (junior subjective synonym); Verconella ormesi A. W. B. Powell, 1927

= Penion ormesi =

Species of gastropod

Penion ormesi is a species of very large predatory sea snail or whelk, a marine gastropod mollusc in the family Austrosiphonidae.

== Description ==
Penion ormesi is a large to very large species of siphon whelk. P. ormesi is benthic, and typically inhabits soft-sediments on the continental shelf.

Recent genetic and geometric morphometric research using shell shape and size has demonstrated that a formerly recognised species Penion cuvierianus jeakingsi is closely related to Penion ormesi, and the taxon has been synonymised. However, further genetic and morphological variation observed among these snails suggests that there may be further diversity within this lineage.

(Original description) The holotype (Fig. 15) measures 201 mm in height and 75 mm in diameter. The paratypes measure 163 mm in height and 65 mm in diameter, and 133 mm in height and 54 mm in diameter, respectively.

The shell is very large and relatively thin, with a short siphonal canal that is slightly curved and widely open, and a tall, well-developed spire. In the holotype, the combined length of the aperture and siphonal canal is approximately 0.971 times the height of the spire. The shell comprises eleven whorls in total.

The protoconch consists of four convex whorls. The first four to five post-nuclear whorls are axially costate and slightly keeled, while the succeeding whorls become rounded and are slightly appressed toward the suture. The sculpture closely resembles that of Verconella dilatata ( (synonym of Penion sulcatus (Lamarck, 1816)), consisting of numerous very fine spiral striae alternating with stronger spiral riblets. The aperture is faintly lirate within.

The outer lip is thin, not dilated, and slightly flexuous. The inner lip spreads as a thin callus across the parietal wall and along the inner edge of the columella. In occasional aged specimens, the callus becomes thickened and is separated from the parietal wall by a shallow groove.

The shell is uniformly pale buff in color, while the interior of the aperture and canal is porcellaneous white. The parietal callus is whitish, sometimes stained with buff or brownish tones. In some specimens, the entire shell is covered with a very thin ochreous-brown epidermis, although this layer is usually worn away; notably, V. dilatata never develops an epidermis.

In a few specimens, the peripheral angle extends onto the body whorl, but no specimens have been observed in which the axial ribs descend below the fifth post-nuclear whorl. The operculum is horny, with a terminal nucleus, and bears a whitish marginal callus on the inner surface, as is typical of the V. dilatata group. It differs from that of V. dilatata in having a flattened upper outer slope that forms an angle of about 52° with the axis, and in the absence of a well-defined nuclear pad on the inner side.

Shells of Penion ormesi
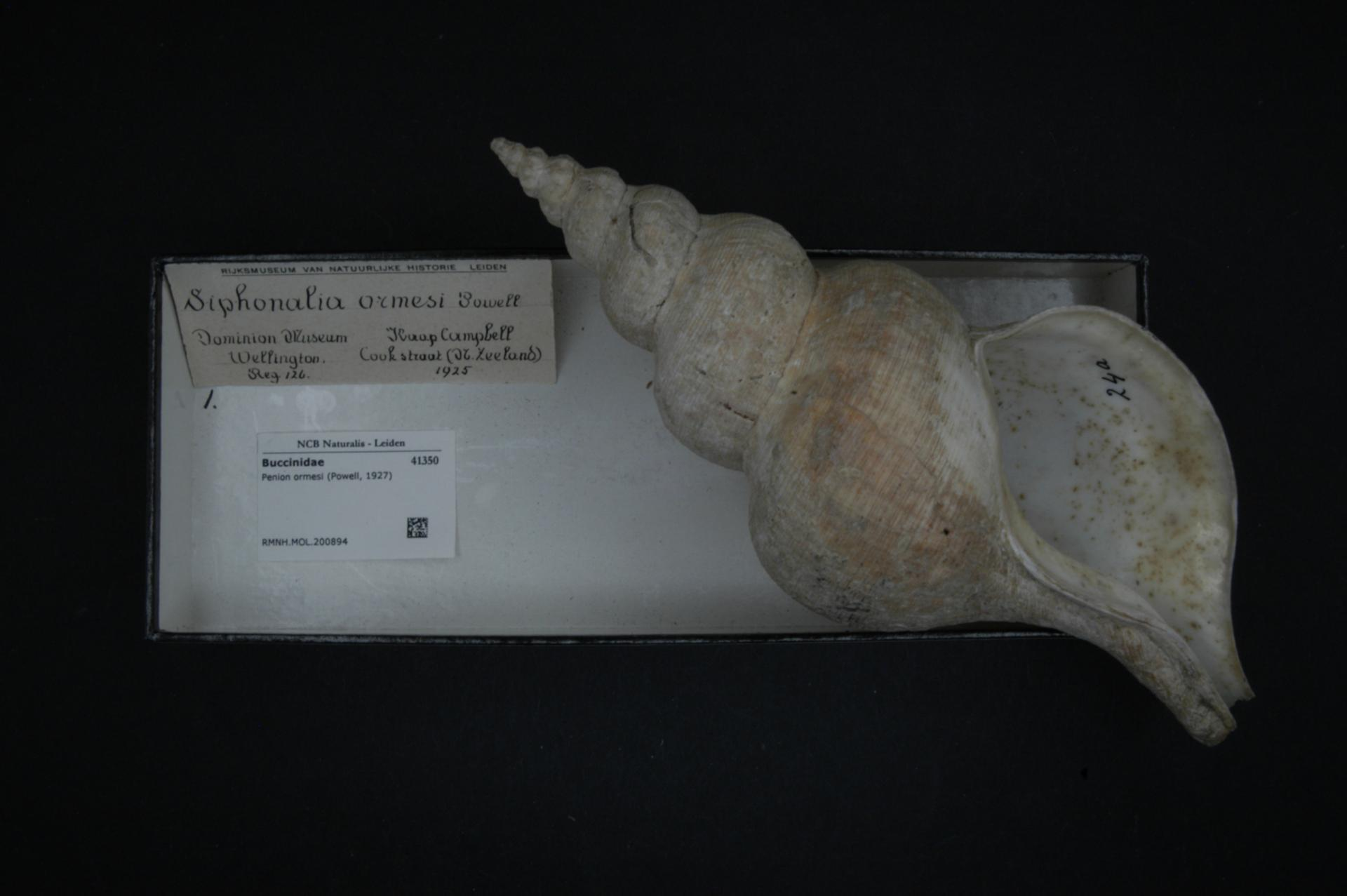
Shell of Penion ormesi (museum specimen at Naturalis Biodiversity Center)

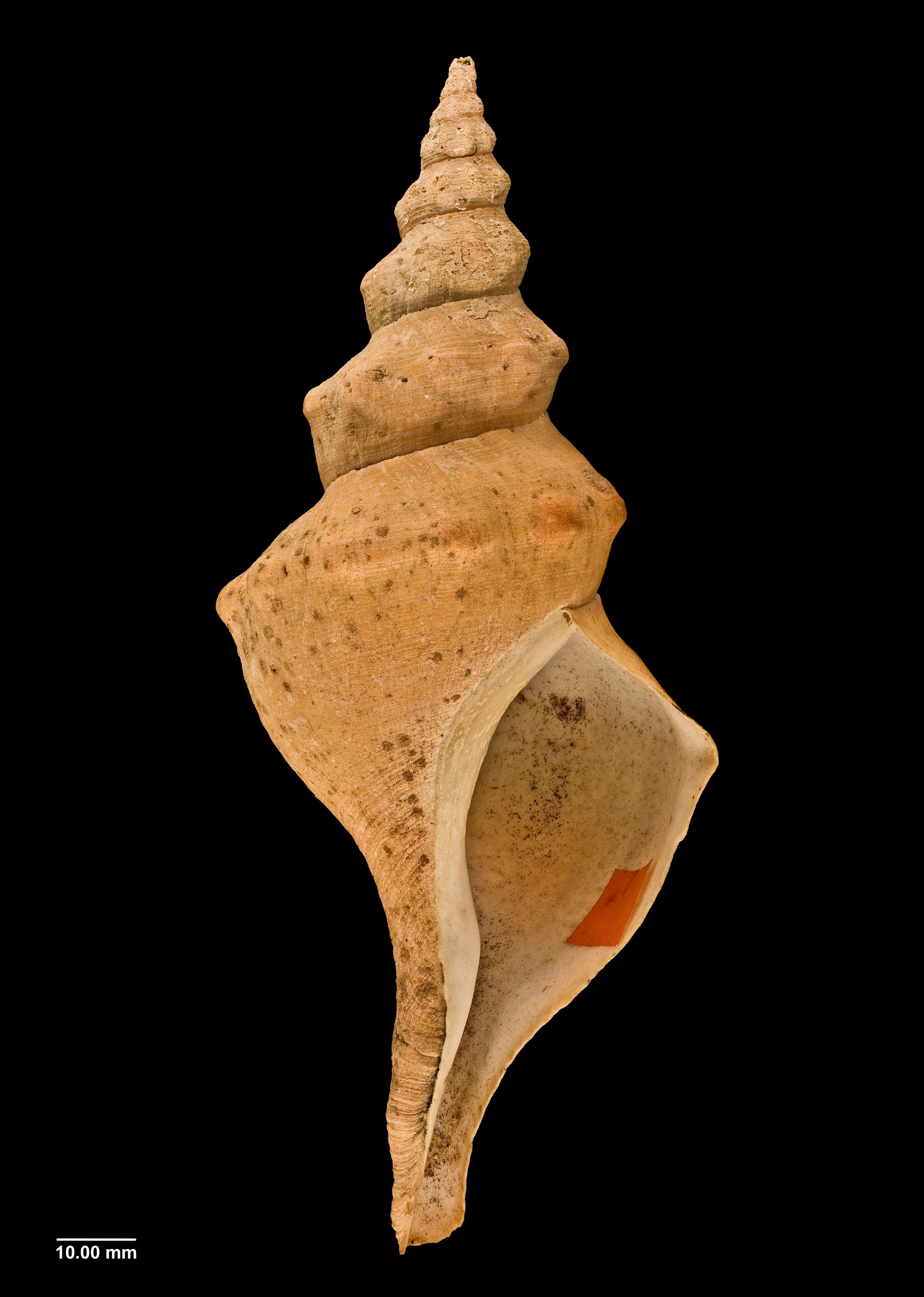
Shell formerly recognised as Penion cuvierianus jeakingsi

== Distribution ==
The species is endemic to New Zealand and is found in the Cook Strait and off the west coast of the South Island. Fossils of the species are recorded from Wanganui.
