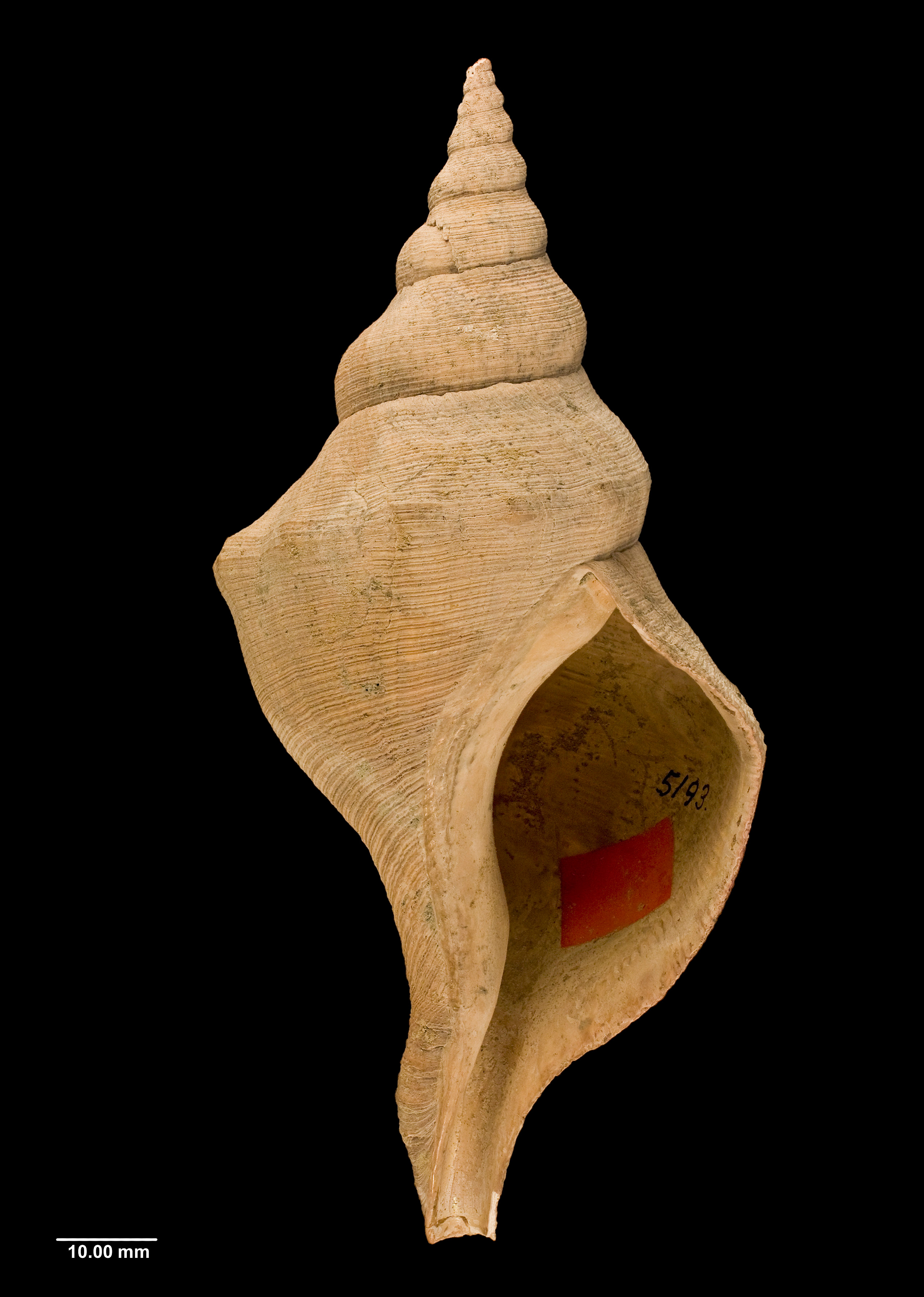
- Holotype from Auckland War Memorial Museum

Scientific classification
- Kingdom: Animalia
- Phylum: Mollusca
- Class: Gastropoda
- Subclass: Caenogastropoda
- Order: Neogastropoda
- Family: Austrosiphonidae
- Genus: Penion
- Species: †P. hiatulus

Binomial name
- †Penion hiatulus (A. W. B. Powell, 1947)

Synonyms
- Verconella hiatula A. W. B. Powell, 1947

= Penion hiatulus =

Penion hiatulus Temporal range: 5.33 Ma

Extinct species of gastropod

Penion hiatulus is an extinct species of marine mollusc gastropod in the family Austrosiphonidae. Fossils of the species date to the Pliocene in New Zealand.

== Description ==
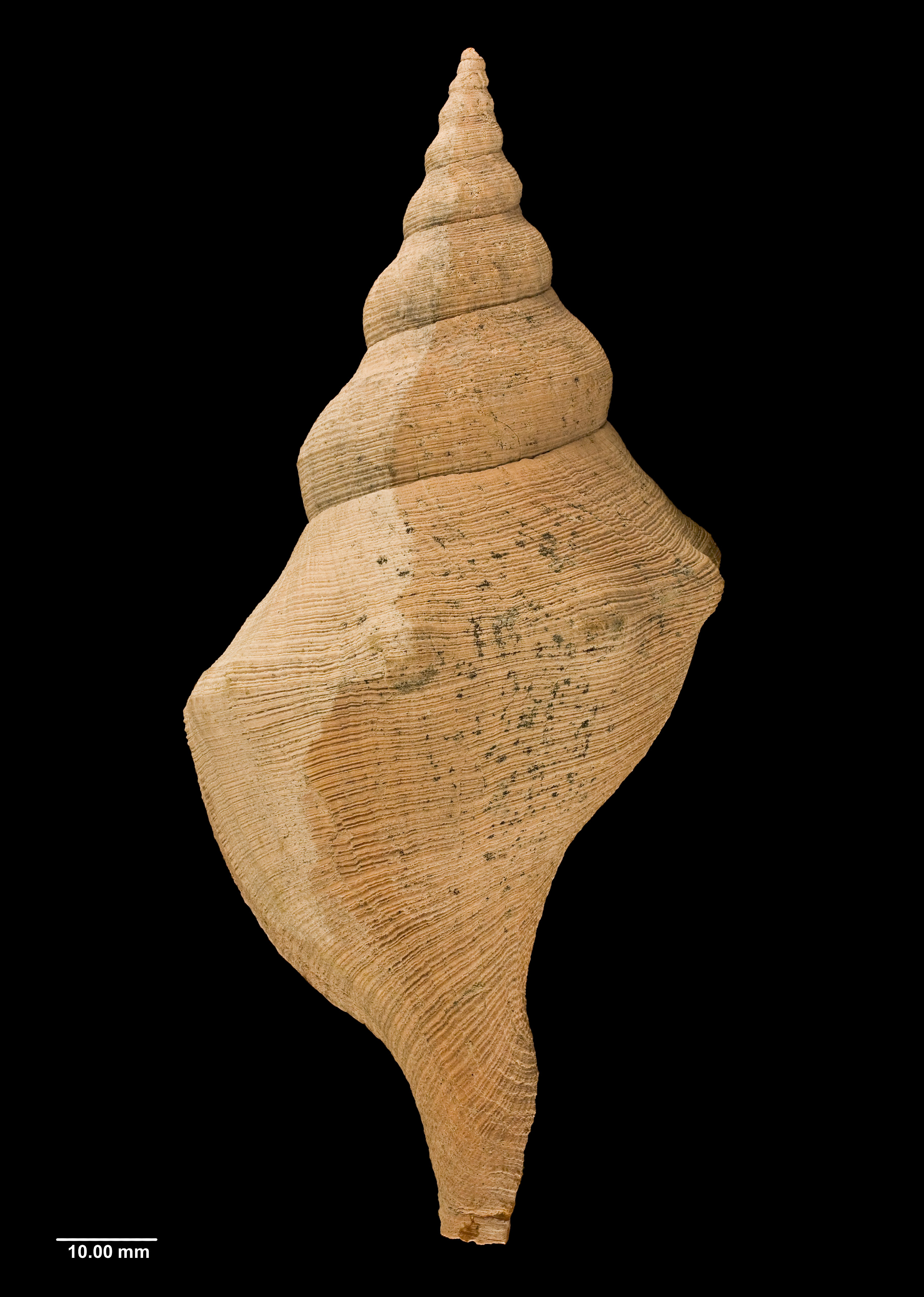
Reverse view of holotype

In the original description, Powell described the species as follows:

The first known member of the elongata series. It differs from all other species in having the middle whorls devoid of axials. Spire angle 45 degrees. Aperture + canal 1.308 times height of spire. Adult whorls 8; protoconch missing. Periphery situated from below the middle to the lower third of whorl height, bluntly angled on the whorls hearing axials but narrowly rounded on those devoid of axials. First four post-nuclear whorls with fold-like axials, next three whorls including the penultimate without axials, body-whorl with eight blunt slightly vertically compressed prominent nodules. The shoulder is broadly but distinctly concave, and descends at an angle of 145 degrees to the axis of the shell. Surface sculpture fine of approximately evenly developed threads, 25-28 per centimeter. Three to five slightly stronger spirals traverse the peripheral nodules. Aperture finely lirate within the slightly thickened outer lip.

The holotype of the species has a height of 125 mm (4.9 in) and a diameter of 56 mm (2.2 in).

== Taxonomy ==
The species was first described by A.W.B. Powell in 1947, using the name Verconella hiatula. The genus Verconella was synonymised with Penion in 1954, leading to the species' current accepted name. The holotype was collected in January 1927 by A. W. B. Powell, from the South Taranaki Bight coast between the Kai Iwi Stream and Okehu Stream in the Whanganui District, New Zealand, and is held by the Auckland War Memorial Museum.

== Distribution ==
This extinct marine species occurs in Pliocene (Opoitian stage) of New Zealand, dating to 5.33 million years before the present.
