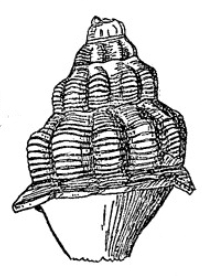
- Shell of † Penion asper (holotype)

Scientific classification
- Kingdom: Animalia
- Phylum: Mollusca
- Class: Gastropoda
- Subclass: Caenogastropoda
- Order: Neogastropoda
- Family: Austrosiphonidae
- Genus: Penion
- Species: †P. asper

Binomial name
- †Penion asper (Marwick, 1928)

Synonyms
- † Austrosipho (Verconella) asper Marwick, 1928 (superseded combination); † Austrosipho asper Marwick, 1928 (superseded combination)

= Penion asper =

Penion asper Temporal range: Early Miocene, 18.7–15.9 Ma

Extinct species of gastropod

Penion asper is an extinct species of marine snail or whelk, belonging to the true whelk family Austrosiphonidae.

== Description ==
The length of the shell attains 140 mm, its diameter 65 mm.

(Original description) The shell is large and fusiform in shape, with a spire that measures less than the combined length of the aperture and the siphonal canal. The protoconch is composed of three smooth, globose whorls featuring a rather small nucleus.

The post-embryonic whorls possess a high, slightly concave, and fairly broad shoulder. The sculpture consists of ten strong, rounded axial ribs that persist from suture to suture, although they appear slightly weaker on the concave shoulder.

On the upper whorls, these axials are crossed by five strong, close spiral cords located on the sides, along with two strong and five weaker spirals on the shoulder. These spirals later increase to seven, three, and six respectively. Furthermore, the interspaces between the strong threads are each filled by one weaker secondary spiral.

== Distribution ==
Fossils of Penion asper are found at Pitt Island, Chatham Islands, New Zealand.
