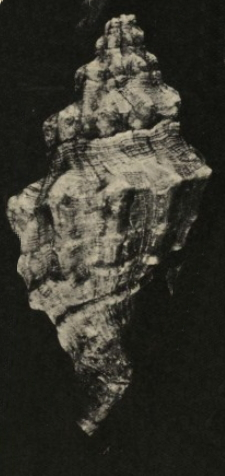
- Shell of Penion exoptatus (holotype)

Scientific classification
- Kingdom: Animalia
- Phylum: Mollusca
- Class: Gastropoda
- Subclass: Caenogastropoda
- Order: Neogastropoda
- Family: Austrosiphonidae
- Genus: Penion
- Species: †P. exoptatus

Binomial name
- †Penion exoptatus (A. W. B. Powell & Bartrum, 1929)

Synonyms
- † Austrosipho (Verconella) exoptatus A. W. B. Powell & Bartrum, 1929 (superseded combination); † Austrosipho exoptatus A. W. B. Powell & Bartrum, 1929 (superseded combination)

= Penion exoptatus =

Penion exoptatus Temporal range: Early Miocene, 18.7–15.9 Ma

Extinct species of gastropod

Penion exoptatus is an extinct species of marine snail or whelk, belonging to the true whelk family Austrosiphonidae.

== Description ==
The length of the shell of the holotype attains 79 mm, (apex missing) its diameter 37 mm.

(Original description) The shell is fusiform and costate, of moderate size for its group, and it features a conical spire that is sub-equal in height to the aperture (excluding the siphonal canal). The spire whorls are angled and distinctly keeled a little below the middle; they are slightly concave at the shoulder and almost flat below. There are about seven post-nuclear whorls, though the apex is missing in the holotype. The suture appears undulating and appressed.

The body whorl is moderately inflated, large, and elongate. It possesses a strong keeled angle above and a fainter one below at the level of the posterior canal, which features a prominent rounded and somewhat nodular keel. The shoulder is decidedly concave, and the whorl descends slowly from the upper angle toward the base.

The axial sculpture consists of regular, broad, rounded ribs—numbering ten on the antepenultimate whorl—which tend to be nodular at the angle. On the body whorl, these ribs continue down to the lower angle but become obsolete on the base. The spiral sculpture over the whole shell is composed of strong, close-spaced lirae, occurring at a density of about three per millimeter. Additionally, the spire whorls have a prominent raised thread at the angle that surmounts the nodules and strengthens considerably on the body whorl. Below this, the body whorl carries four or five sub-equidistant carinae that are similar but more rounded and stronger; the upper two are decidedly nodular where they meet the ribs, while those on the base are not.

The aperture is fairly narrowly ovate, being narrowly notched above and contracting below into a very long, open, and fairly narrow anterior canal. This siphonal canal is obliquely arched to the left, strongly recurved, and distinctly notched at the base. This structure yields a fairly smooth, narrow, and rounded raised fasciole that passes up close to the columella, from which it is imperfectly separated.

The outer lip (observed in the paratype) is thin at the edge, strongly angled above, and concave at the shoulder. It is gently convex below the shoulder, though it exhibits minor sinuosity at the spiral keels in younger paratypes; this feature is imperfect in the holotype. The inner lip is spread as a narrow glaze on the parietal wall and the columella, though it forms a thin, narrowly pointed plate on the columella of some mature paratypes. The columella is erect and straight above, but below it is strongly flexed to the left and slightly to the rear.

The extinct species Penion exoptatus, Penion clifdenensis, and potentially also Penion marwicki, may belong to the same evolutionary lineage as the extant species Penion sulcatus. This hypothesis is based on geometric morphometric analysis of shell shape and size for all four taxa, as well as the analysis of morphometric variation exhibited all living species of Penion.

== Distribution ==
Fossils of Penion affixus were found in Hutchinsonian Formation, New Zealand.
