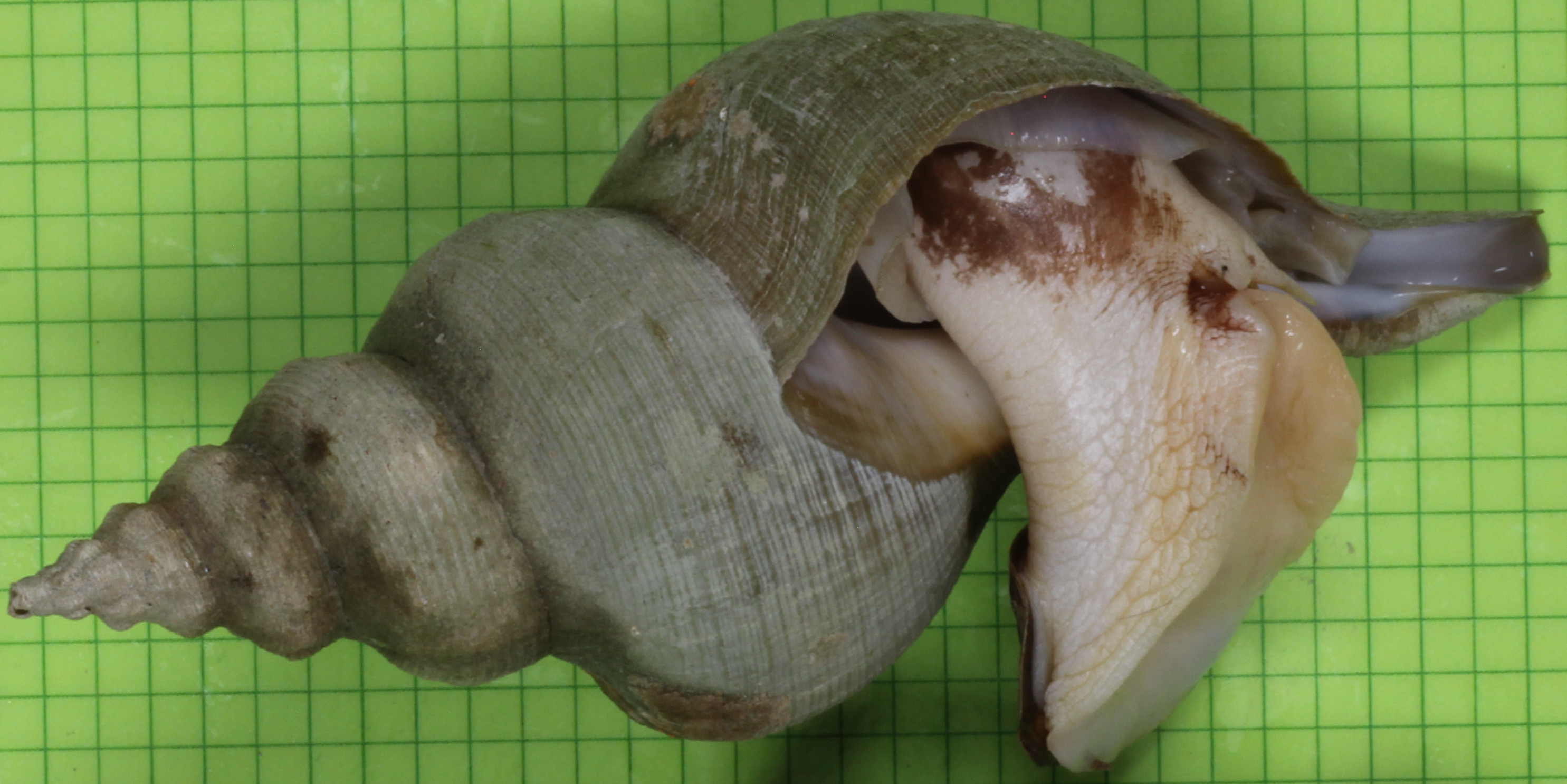
- A siphon whelk Penion ormesi, collected from Golden Bay in New Zealand

Scientific classification
- Kingdom: Animalia
- Phylum: Mollusca
- Class: Gastropoda
- Subclass: Caenogastropoda
- Order: Neogastropoda
- Family: Austrosiphonidae
- Genus: Penion; P. Fischer, 1884

Species
- See text

Synonyms
- Austrosipho Cossmann, 1906; Austrosipho (Verconella) Iredale, 1914; Berylsma Iredale, 1924; Largisipho Iredale, 1929; Penion (Austrosipho) Cossmann, 1906; Siphonalia (Penion) P. Fischer, 1884 superseded rank; Verconella Iredale, 1914

= Penion =

Penion Temporal range: Early Paleocene to Recent, 66.0–0.0 Ma

Genus of gastropods

Penion is a genus of large marine snails, commonly known as siphon whelks, classified within the mollusc family Austrosiphonidae.

== Description ==
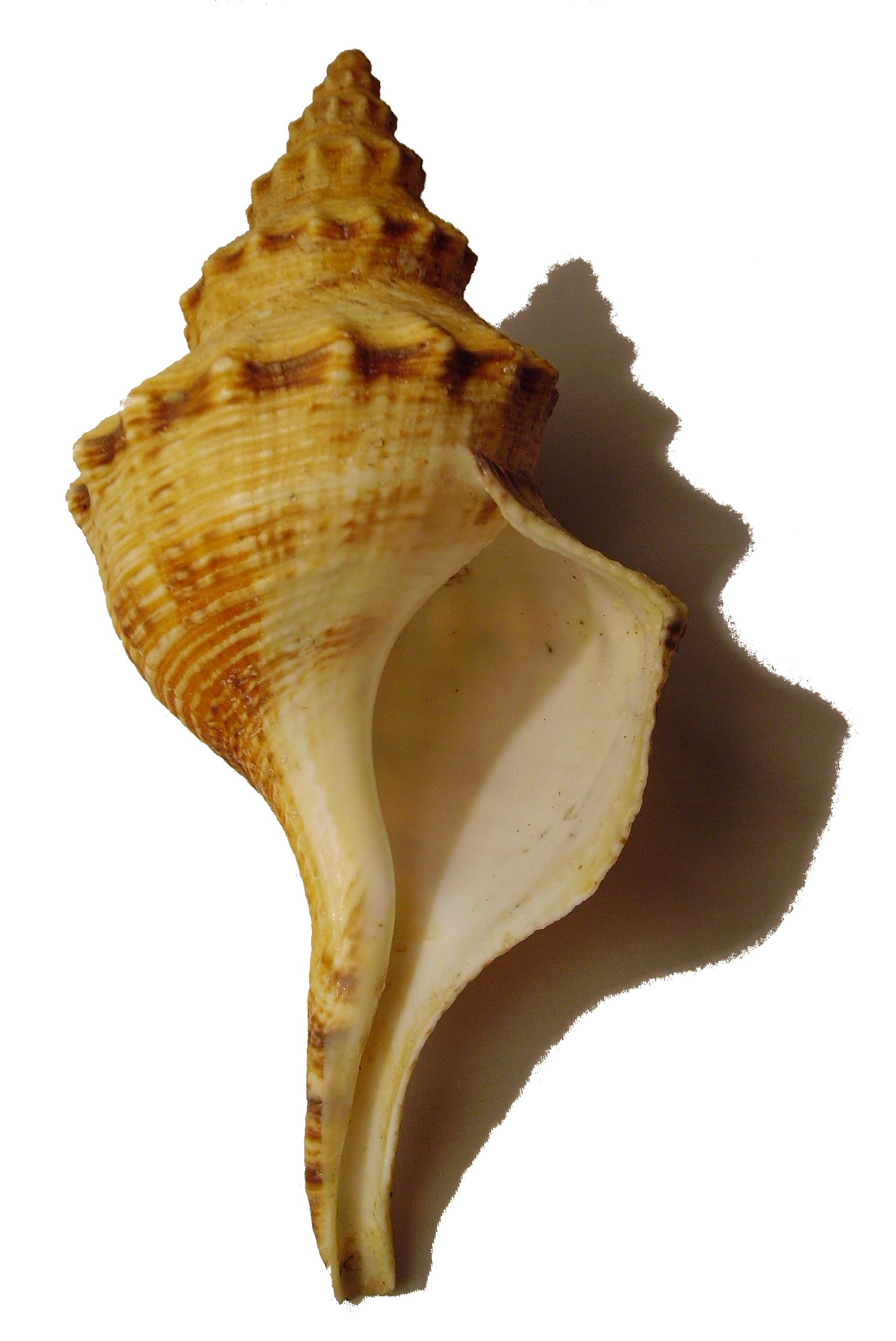
An apertural view of a shell of Penion maximus

Siphon whelks are large, benthic marine snails, or whelks.

Penion are commonly called siphon whelks because they have a very long siphon. Species typically have a large, pointed operculum. Radulae have 3 or 4 cusps on lateral teeth and 3 cusps on central teeth.

Males have a long, dorso-ventrally flattened penis, and correspondingly females have a large pallial oviduct and albumen gland. However, geometric morphometric investigation of P. chathamensis indicates that secondary sexual dimorphism is not prominent for shell shape or size.

Shells of Penion vary significantly in shape, size and colouration, making the distinction of species difficult. Shells are fusiform with a tall spire of roughly equal height to the aperture and siphonal canal combined. Protoconch morphology is also highly variable, from 1.5 - 4.0 whorls in height. The siphonal canal of the shell is often long to protect the elongated siphon. Small shells (or fossils) can be confused with those of Aeneator or Antarctoneptunea.

Shell size can vary quite significantly among populations of Penion. A species, Penion fairfieldae was formerly recognised, but recent genetic data has demonstrated that the species is indistinguishable from Penion chathamensis. Shells originally recognised as P. fairfieldae can be distinguished from P. chathamensis using shell size, but not using shell shape.

== Ecology ==
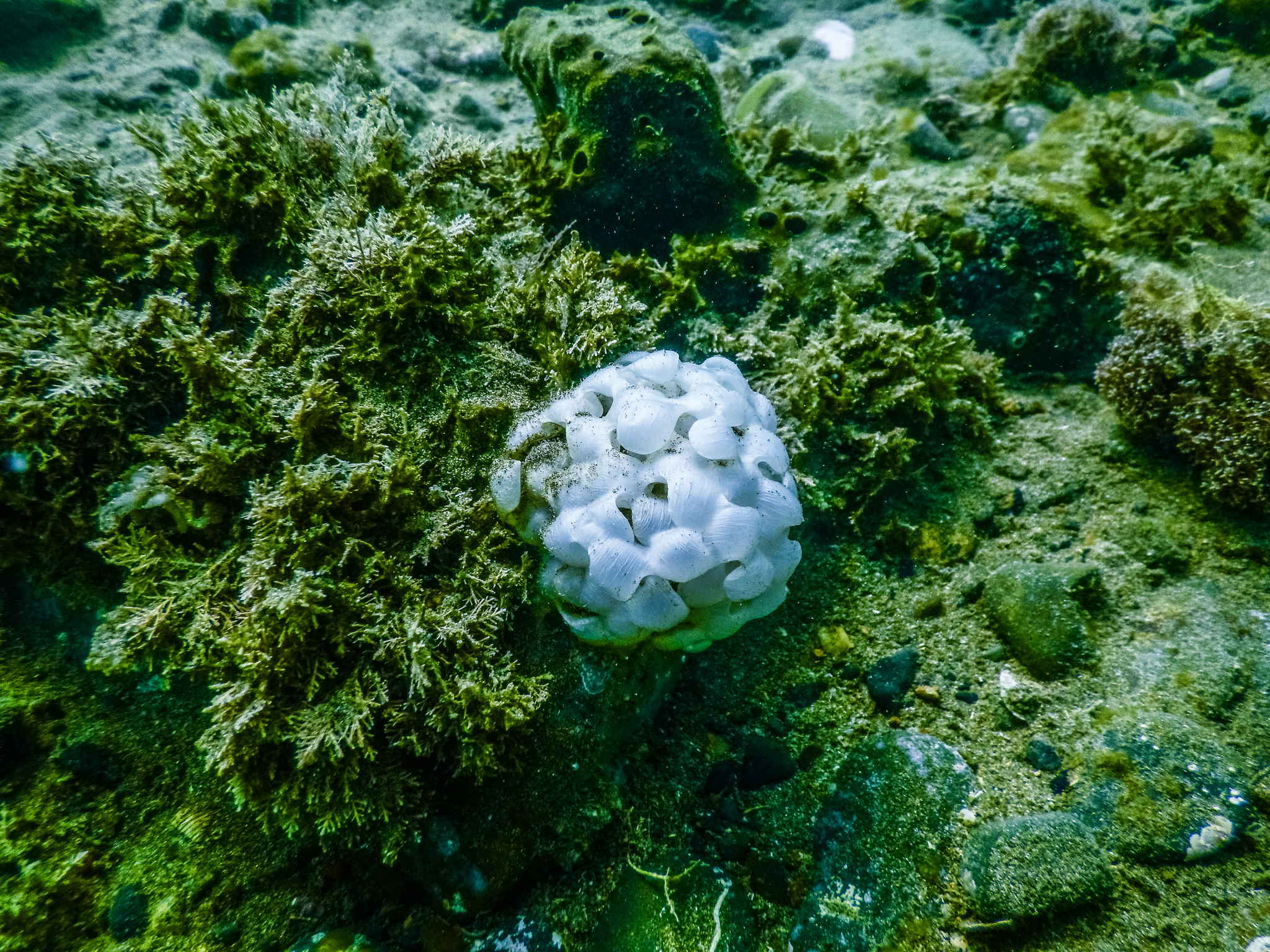
Egg capsules of Penion sulcatus at Kawau Bay, Hauraki Gulf

Most species occur in deep water, and inhabit soft sediments on the continental shelf.

All species of Penion have a wide ranging diet, and are detritivores and carnivores that actively hunt prey. P. sulcatus is known to feed on mussels and Dosina zelandica zelandica. Members of the genus have similar niche placement to species of Buccinum in the Northern Hemisphere.

== Distribution ==
Penion species are restricted to the Southern Hemisphere. Two extant species are currently classified in waters surrounding Australia and five extant species are documented from New Zealand.

Numerous fossil species are recorded in New Zealand, Australia, Argentina and Chile, and Antarctica. In New Zealand, many fossils are found in Wanganui Basin sediments.

During the voyage of HMS Beagle, fossils of P. subrectus were among palaeontological samples collected by Charles Darwin from the mouth of the Santa Cruz River in Argentina.

== Evolution ==
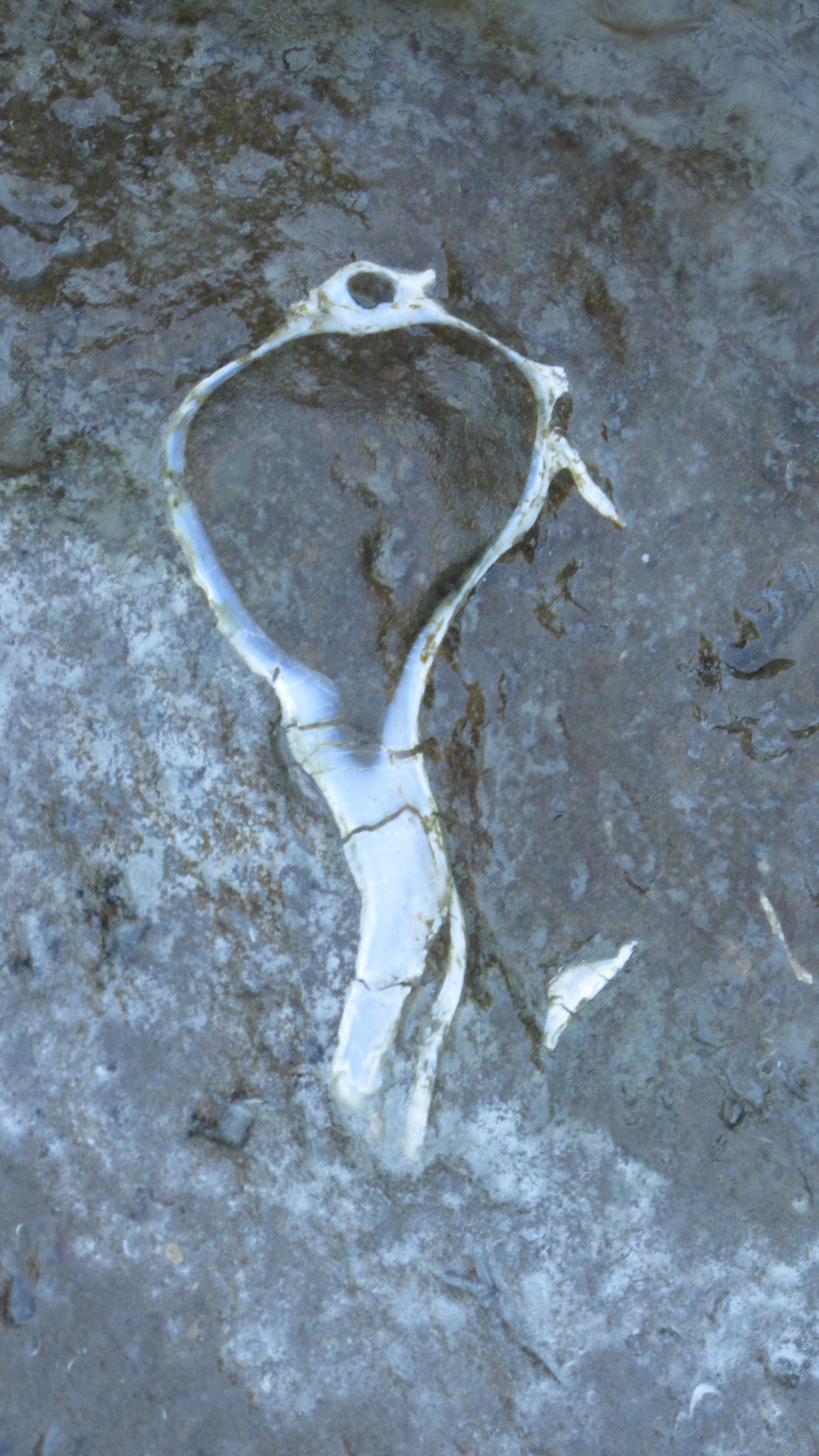
An embedded fossil of Penion crawfordi from Cape Palliser, New Zealand

Penion is currently classified within Austrosiphonidae, a which is a family of large buccinoid whelks. Penion has previously been classified within the families Buccinidae and Buccinulidae.

Cladogram of Austrosiphonidae and Tudiclidae

- - - Antarctoneptunea
    - Kelletia
    - Penion
    - Serratifusus
- - Aeneator
  - Buccinulum
  - Euthria
  - Tasmeuthria

Molecular phylogenetic trees based on mitochondrial genomic and nuclear ribosomal DNA sequence data indicate that Penion is closely related to two genera: Kelletia found in the north Pacific Ocean and Antarctoneptunea, distributed in waters surrounding New Zealand and Antarctica., as well as Serratifusus. Radulae and opercula morphology is similar between Penion and Kelletia. It is possible that the earliest known fossils of Penion belonging to P. proavitus from the New Zealand Paleocene (Teurian), actually represent a stem lineage that was the common ancestor of these three genera.

In Australian waters, the sister species P. mandarinus and P. maximus have overlapping geographic ranges (sympatry), and may have evolved from a common ancestor via niche differentiation based on prey size and water depth.

In New Zealand, the extinct species Penion exoptatus, Penion clifdenensis, and potentially also Penion marwicki, may belong to the same evolutionary lineage as the extant species Penion sulcatus. This hypothesis is based on geometric morphometric analysis of shell shape and size for all four taxa, as well as the analysis of morphometric variation exhibited all living species of Penion.

== Human use ==
Penion shells are prized by shell collectors.

Shells found in middens of historic Māori settlements indicate that P. sulcatus may have been intentionally foraged as a food-source.

== Species ==
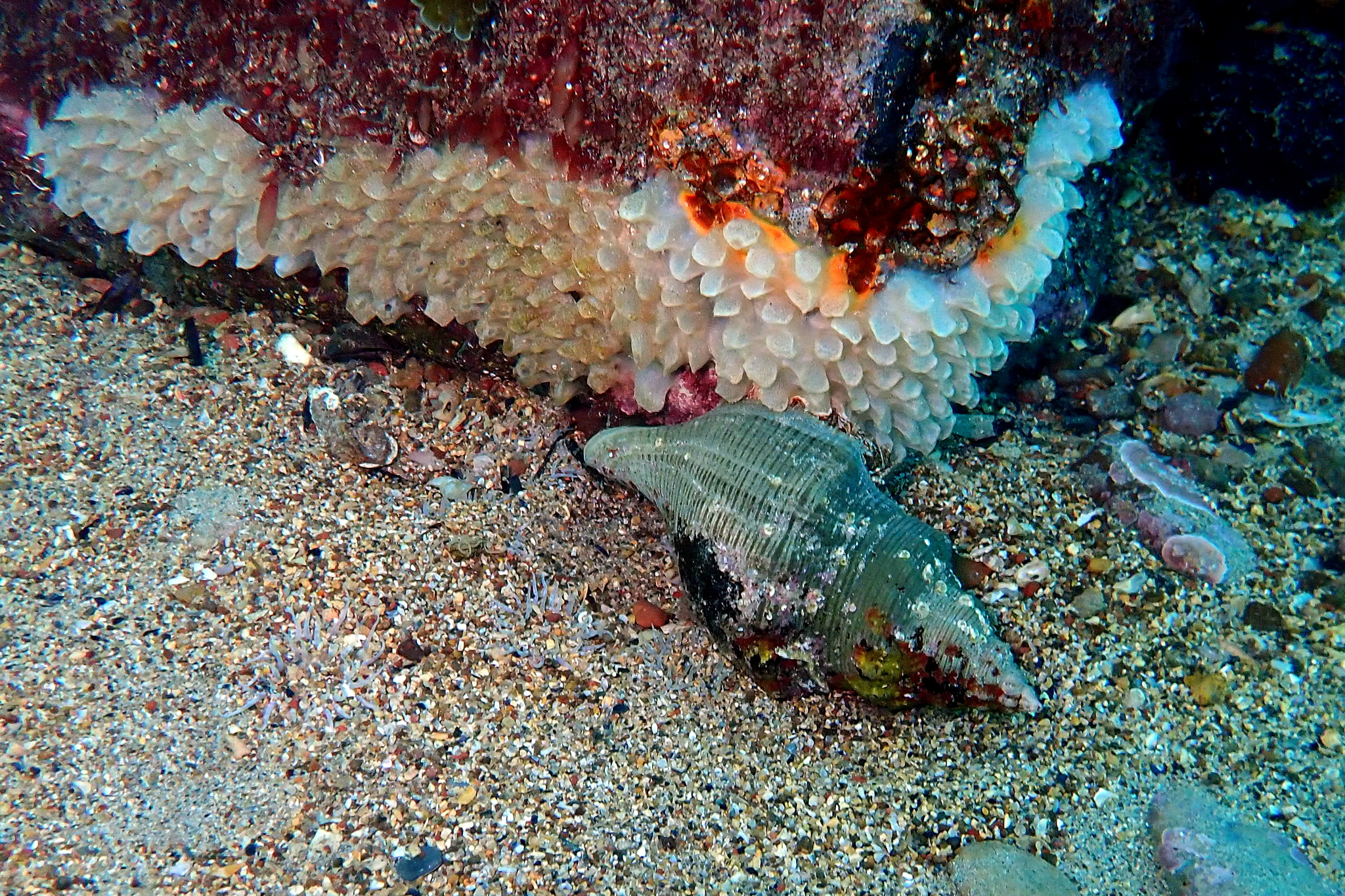
Penion mandarinus with eggs at Kennon Cove in Flinders

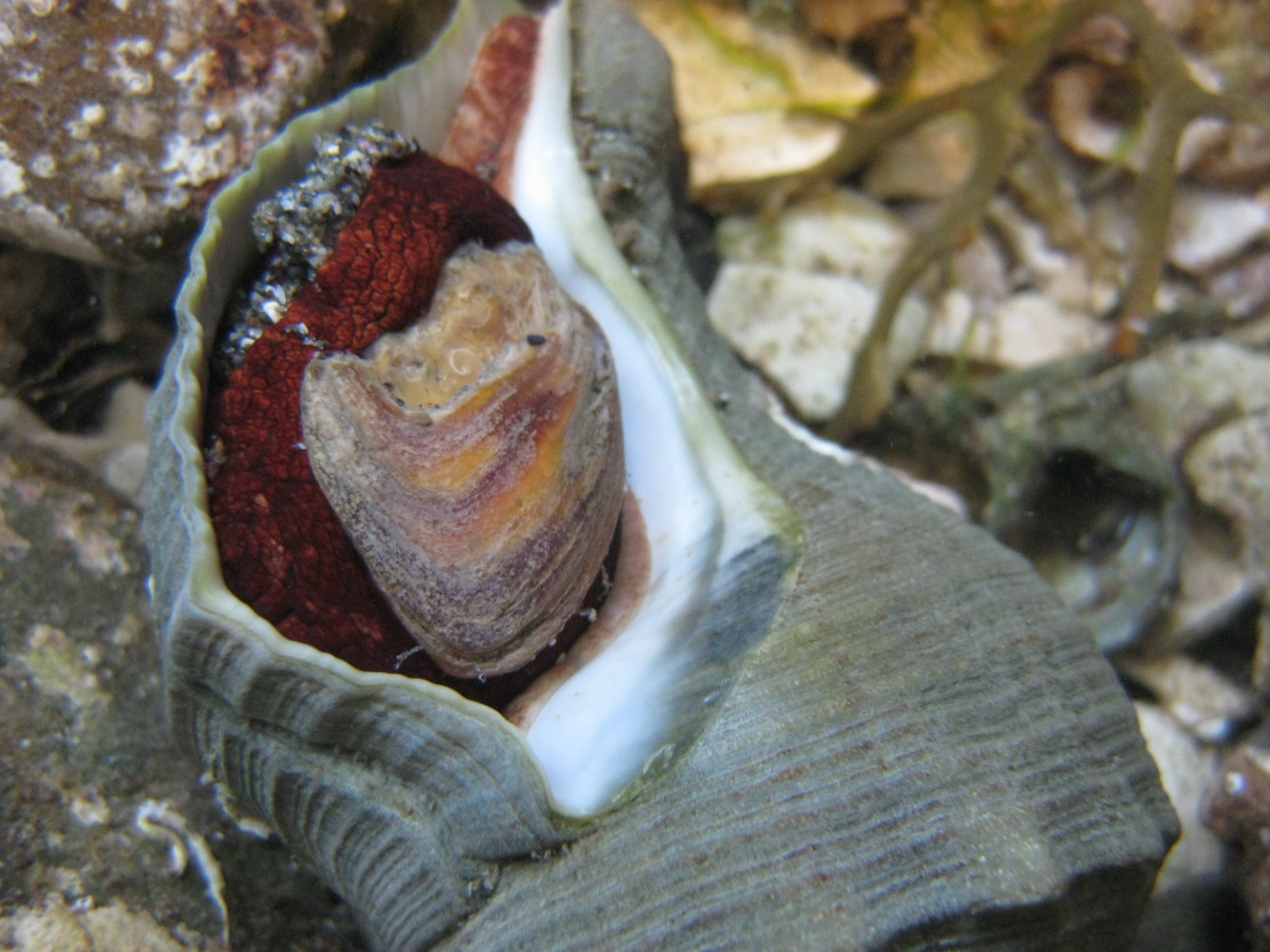
Penion sulcatus near Goat Island, New Zealand with a damaged operculum

Species and subspecies in the genus Penion include:

- † Penion affixus (Finlay, 1930)
- † Penion antarctocarinatus (Stilwell & Zinsmeister, 1992)
- † Penion asper (Marwick, 1928)
- † Penion australocapax Stilwell & Zinsmeister, 1992
- † Penion bartrumi (Laws, 1941)
- † Penion brazieri (Fleming, 1955)
- Penion chathamensis (Powell, 1938)
- † Penion clifdenensis (Finlay, 1930)
- † Penion crassus Frassinetti, 2000
- † Penion crawfordi (Hutton, 1873)
- † Penion crebissimus (I. Lea, 1833)
- Penion cuvierianus (Powell, 1927)
- † Penion delabechii (I. Lea, 1833)
- † Penion darwinianus (Philippi, 1887)
- † Penion diversus Frassinetti, 2000
- † Penion domeykoanus (Philippi, 1887)
- † Penion exoptatus (Powell & Bartrum, 1929)
- † Penion finlayi (Laws, 1930)
- † Penion gauli (Marwick, 1948)
- † Penion haweraensis (Powell, 1931)
- † Penion hiatulus (Powell, 1947)
- † Penion huttoni (L.R. King, 1934)
- † Penion imperfectus (Powell, 1947)
- † Penion interjunctus (Finlay, 1930)
- † Penion koruahinensis (Powell & Bartrum, 1928)
- Penion lineatus Marshall, Hills & Vaux, 2018
- † Penion longirostris (Tate, 1888)
- † Penion macsporrani (Philippi, 1887)
- Penion mandarinus (Duclos, P.L., 1831)
- † Penion marwicki (Finlay, 1930)
- Penion maximus (Tryon, G.W., 1881)
- † Penion oncodes (Philippi, 1887)
- Penion ormesi (Powell, 1927)
- † Penion parans (Finlay, 1930)
- † Penion patagonensis Reichler, 2010
- † Penion petitianus (d'Orbigny, 1842)
- † Penion proavitus (Finlay & Marwick, 1937)
- † Penion roblini (Tenison Woods, 1876)
- † Penion spatiosus (Tate, 1888)
- † Penion subrectus (Ihering, 1899)
- † Penion subreflexus (G.B. Sowerby I, 1846)
- † Penion subregularis (d'Orbigny, 1852)
- Penion sulcatus (Lamarck, 1816)
- † Penion winthropi (Marwick, 1965)

=== Nomina dubia ===
Beu 2009 lists the following Antarctic fossil species as nomina dubia:

- † Penion gazdzicki (Karczewski, 1987), previously Neptunea and Beringius, potentially Antarctoneptunea

=== Species brought into synonymy ===
- Penion adustus (Philippi, 1845): synonym of Penion sulcatus (Lamarck, 1816)
- Penion cuvierianus jeakingsi (Powell, 1947): synonym of Penion ormesi (Powell, 1927)
- Penion dilatatus (Quoy & Gaimard, 1833): synonym of Penion sulcatus (Lamarck, 1816)
- Penion fairfieldae (Powell, 1947): synonym of Penion chathamensis (Powell, 1938)

=== Reclassified species ===
- Penion benthicolus Dell, 1956: accepted as Antarctoneptunea benthicola (Dell, 1956)
