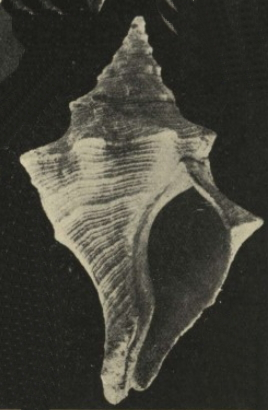
- Shell of Penion clifdenensis (holotype)

Scientific classification
- Kingdom: Animalia
- Phylum: Mollusca
- Class: Gastropoda
- Subclass: Caenogastropoda
- Order: Neogastropoda
- Family: Austrosiphonidae
- Genus: Penion
- Species: †P. clifdenensis

Binomial name
- †Penion clifdenensis (Finlay, 1930)

Synonyms
- † Verconella clifdenensis Finlay, 1930

= Penion clifdenensis =

Penion clifdenensis Temporal range: Early Miocene, 18.7–15.9 Ma

Extinct species of gastropod

Penion clifdenensis is an extinct species of marine snail or whelk, belonging to the true whelk family Austrosiphonidae.

== Description ==
The length of the shell attains 41 mm, its diameter 26 mm. The species reaches at least 65 mm height as shown by imperfect paratypes.

(Original description) The shell is rather small and very spiny, appearing extremely like Falsicolus kaiparaensis (Suter, 1917) in its general aspect; however, it possesses a siphonal canal and apex, typical for a Penion.

This apex is composed of 3 to 3½ smooth, convex whorls that are cylindroconic in shape. The first whorl increases very rapidly from a minute, adpressed tip, eventually becoming equal in diameter to the next whorl and somewhat overhanging it on one side. There is a slight but distinct subangulation located low down on its whorls, and the structure ends in a small varix.

The first described adult whorl is marked by seven axials, which increase to eight or nine on the central whorls, though they may return to a count of seven on the later ones. These axials are thick and stout; at first, they extend from suture to suture, though they appear narrower on the shoulder. Later, they become subobsolete on the shoulder but remain much heavier and stronger from the periphery to the lower suture.

On the periphery, these axials project as long, sharp, and strong spines that are vertically compressed and keeled by a spiral cord. These spines are directed outward and, at first, slightly upward, but as the shell becomes senile, they tend to point downward. Below the periphery, the axials rapidly diminish and finally cease at a basal angulation marked by a strong cord, which is also rendered tubercular—though the tubercles in this area are very narrow and elongated.

The spirals are even and fine on the shoulder, with interstices measuring about twice their width and featuring an interstitial hair-thread. On the base, the spirals become irregular; there are two equidistant stronger ones located between the periphery and the lower angulation, with weaker ones and still weaker ones interspersed between them. This arrangement continues down onto the neck of the siphonal canal, except that the main spirals gradually get closer together.

The aperture and siphonal canal are typical of the genus, resembling those found in Penion sulcatus. However, in senile specimens, the fasciole is enormously developed and circles outwards in a strong, sharp carina, which encloses a small umbilical chink. There are six to seven adult whorls in total, which are strongly carinate at the lower third or fourth.

The extinct species Penion exoptatus, Penion clifdenensis, and potentially also Penion marwicki, may belong to the same evolutionary lineage as the extant species Penion sulcatus. This hypothesis is based on geometric morphometric analysis of shell shape and size for all four taxa, as well as the analysis of morphometric variation exhibited all living species of Penion.

== Distribution ==
Fossils of Penion clifdenensis are found in the Hutchinsonian strata at Clifden, New Zealand.
