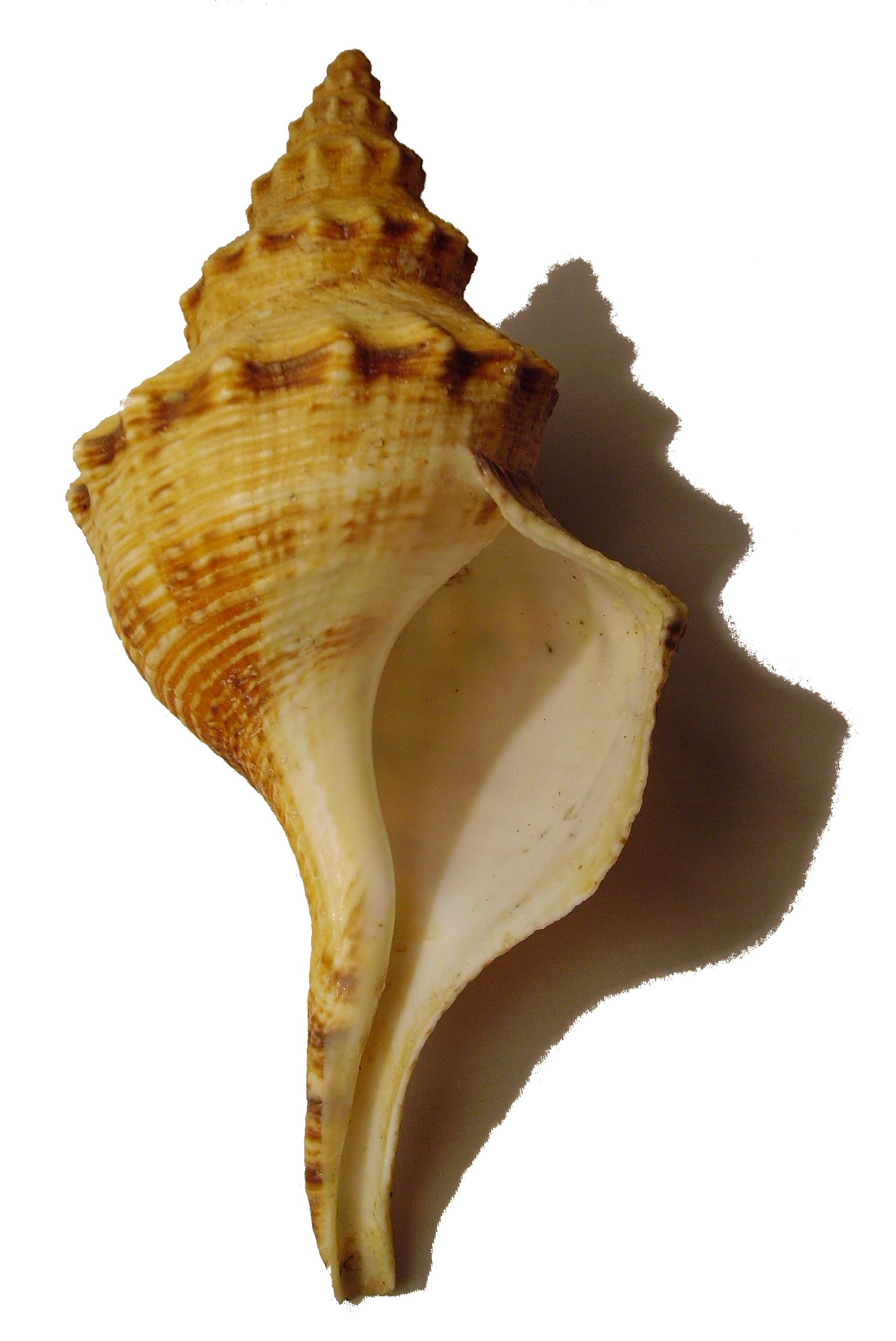
- Penion maximus

Scientific classification
- Kingdom: Animalia
- Phylum: Mollusca
- Class: Gastropoda
- Subclass: Caenogastropoda
- Order: Neogastropoda
- Superfamily: Buccinoidea
- Family: Austrosiphonidae; Cotton & Godfrey, 1938

Genera
- See text

= Austrosiphonidae =

Family of large sea snails

The Austrosiphonidae are a taxonomic family of large sea snails, often known as whelks.

== Genera ==
- Antarctoneptunea Dell, 1972
- Kelletia P. Fischer, 1884
- Penion P. Fischer, 1884
- Serratifusus Darragh, 1969

Synonyms

- Austrosipho Cossmann, 1906: synonym of Penion P. Fischer, 1884
- Berylsma Iredale, 1924: synonym of Penion P. Fischer, 1884
- Largisipho Iredale, 1929: synonym of Penion P. Fischer, 1884
- Verconella Iredale, 1914: synonym of Penion P. Fischer, 1884 (unnecessary substitute name for Penion, by Iredale assumed to be a junior homonym of Penium Philippi, 1865.)

Cladogram of Austrosiphonidae and Tudiclidae

- - - Antarctoneptunea
    - Kelletia
    - Penion
    - Serratifusus
- - Aeneator
  - Buccinulum
  - Euthria
  - Tasmeuthria
