= Whelk =

Common name that is applied to various kinds of sea snail

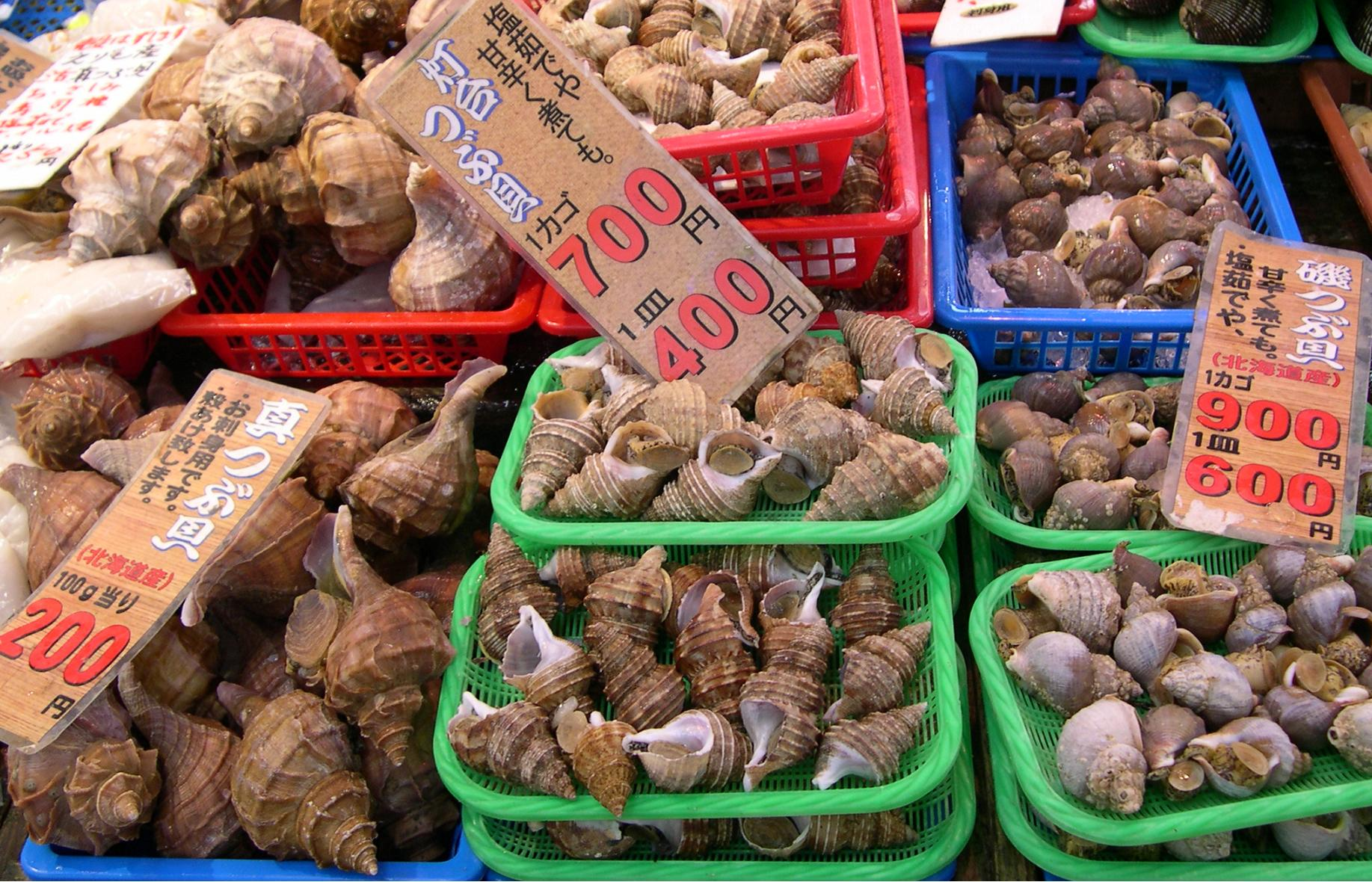
Several different species of large whelks in the family Buccinidae, the true whelks, on sale at a fish market in Japan

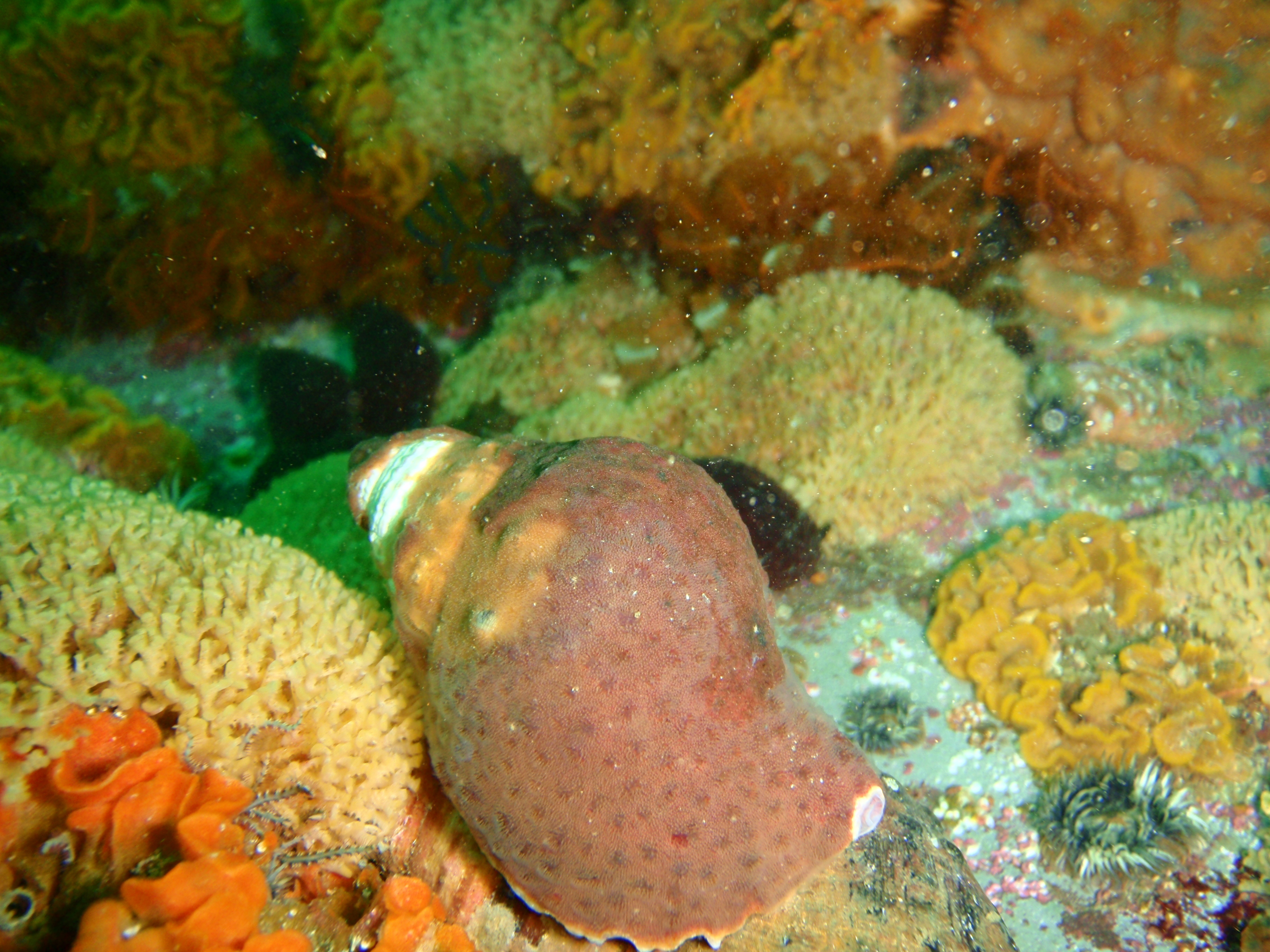
A whelk at Miller's Point near Cape Town

Whelks or welks are any of several carnivorous sea snail species with a swirling, tapered shell. Many are eaten by humans, such as the common whelk of the North Atlantic. Most whelks belong to the family Buccinidae and are known as "true whelks." Others, such as the dog whelk, belong to several sea snail families that are not closely related.

True whelks (family Buccinidae) are carnivorous, and feed on annelids, crustaceans, mussels and other molluscs, drilling holes through shells to gain access to the soft tissues. Whelks use chemoreceptors to locate their prey.

Many have historically been used, or are still used, by humans and other animals as food. In a 100-gram (3 1/2-ounce) reference serving of whelk, there are 570 kilojoules (137 kilocalories) of food energy, 24 g of protein, 0.34 g of fat, and 8 g of carbohydrates.

Dog whelk, a predatory species, was used in antiquity to make a rich red dye that improves in color as it ages.

== Usage ==
The common name "whelk" is also spelled welk or even wilk.

The species, genera and families referred to by this common name vary a great deal from one geographic area to another.

=== Asia ===
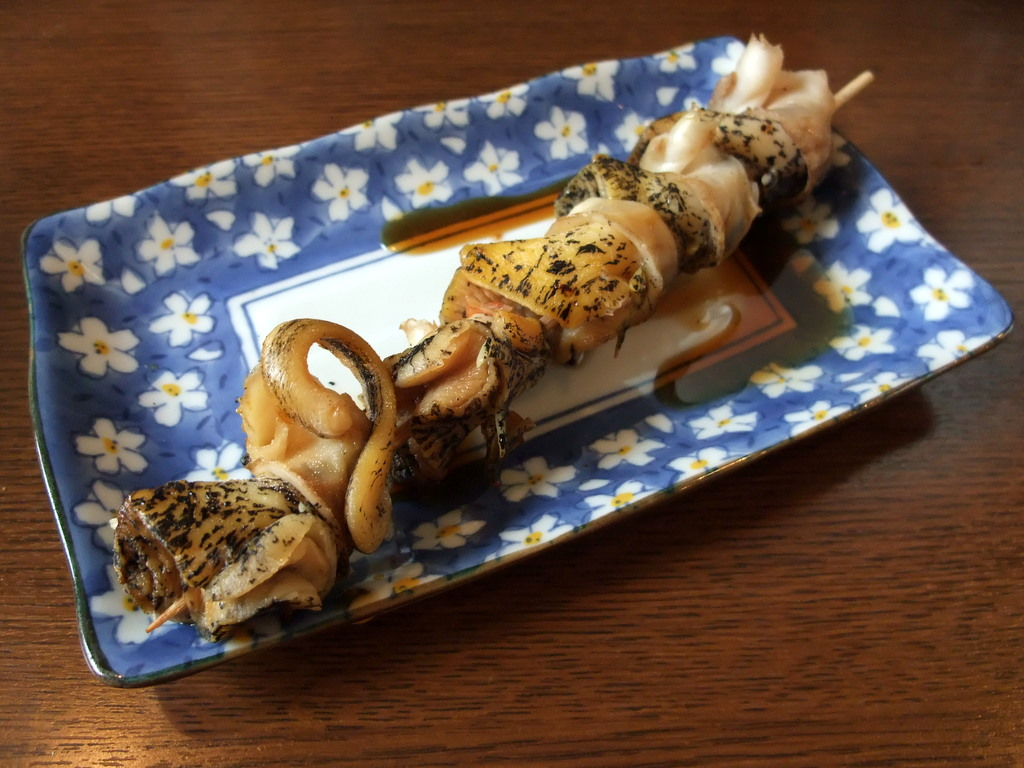
Skewered whelks from Japan

In Japan, tsubu (ツブ, 螺) or tsubu-gai (ツブ貝) (Note: Where gai is an inflection of kai meaning clam or shell.) is a general term for mid- or large-sized species of the Buccinidae family, (Note: Japanese: ezobai-ka.) i.e., true whelks, including Buccinum spp. (Note: Japanese: ezobai-zoku.) and Neptunea spp. (Note: Japanese: ezobora-zoku.) (e.g. Neptunea arthritica). These are eaten braised or grilled and nowadays used in sushi, but tsubu-gai was formerly not typically used by sushi establishments. (Note: Note that Lowry (2005) describes tsubu-gai as an inferior version of the sazae (Turbo sazae), used the same way culinarily, and comments that the sazae was not used as "sushi tane in sushi until about 25 years ago".) One warning is that the Neptunea genus has a gland containing the toxin tetramine (Tetramethylammonium).

In Korea, the golbaengi (골뱅이) marketed as "whelk" refers specifically to the moon snail Neverita didyma often eaten as snack food, e.g. in the dish called golbaengi-muchim (골뱅이무침), (Note: Or perhaps tather golbaengi-muchim guksu (골뱅이무침국수, "moon snail seasoned, with noodles").) a sort of mixed salad consisting of this whelk (moon snail) blended with chili sauce and cold noodles. It has been a very "quintessential" side dish with alcohol. This species is also known by the common name keun-gu-seul-u-leong (큰구슬우렁).

=== Australia, New Zealand ===
In Australia and New Zealand, species of the genus Cabestana (family Ranellidae) are called predatory whelks, and species of Penion (family Buccinidae) are called siphon whelks.

=== Brazil ===
In Brazil, there is a very popular Afro-Brazilian divination game practiced by older women of African ancestry called jogo de búzios (game of whelks), which uses empty shells of these gastropods.

=== United Kingdom and Ireland, Belgium, Netherlands ===
In the British Isles, Belgium and the Netherlands (wulk/wullok), the word is used for a number of species in the family Buccinidae, especially Buccinum undatum, an edible European and Northern Atlantic species.

In the British Isles, the common name "dog whelk" is used for Nucella lapillus (family Muricidae) and for Nassarius species (family Nassariidae). Historically, they were a popular street food in Victorian London, sold from stalls typically located close to public houses and theatres.

==== Scotland ====
In Scotland, the word "whelk" is also used to mean the periwinkle (Littorina littorea), family Littorinidae.

=== United States ===
In the United States, whelk refers to several large edible species in the genera Busycon and Busycotypus, which are now classified in the family Buccinidae. These are sometimes called Busycon whelks.

In addition, the unrelated invasive species Rapana venosa is referred to as the Veined rapa whelk or Asian rapa whelk despite it being a murex in the family Muricidae.

=== West Indies ===
In the English-speaking islands of the West Indies, the word whelks or wilks (this word is both singular and plural) is applied to a large edible top shell, Cittarium pica, also known as the magpie or West Indian top shell, family Trochidae.

== Some common examples ==
- Channeled whelk
- Common whelk
- Knobbed whelk, the state shell of Georgia and New Jersey
- Lightning whelk
- Red whelk
- Speckled whelk
- "Wrinkled whelk", "inflated whelk", and "lyre whelk", common names for Neptunea lyrata
- Wrinkled purple whelk

== See also ==
- Conch, another common name used for a wide variety of large sea snails or their shells
- scungilli
