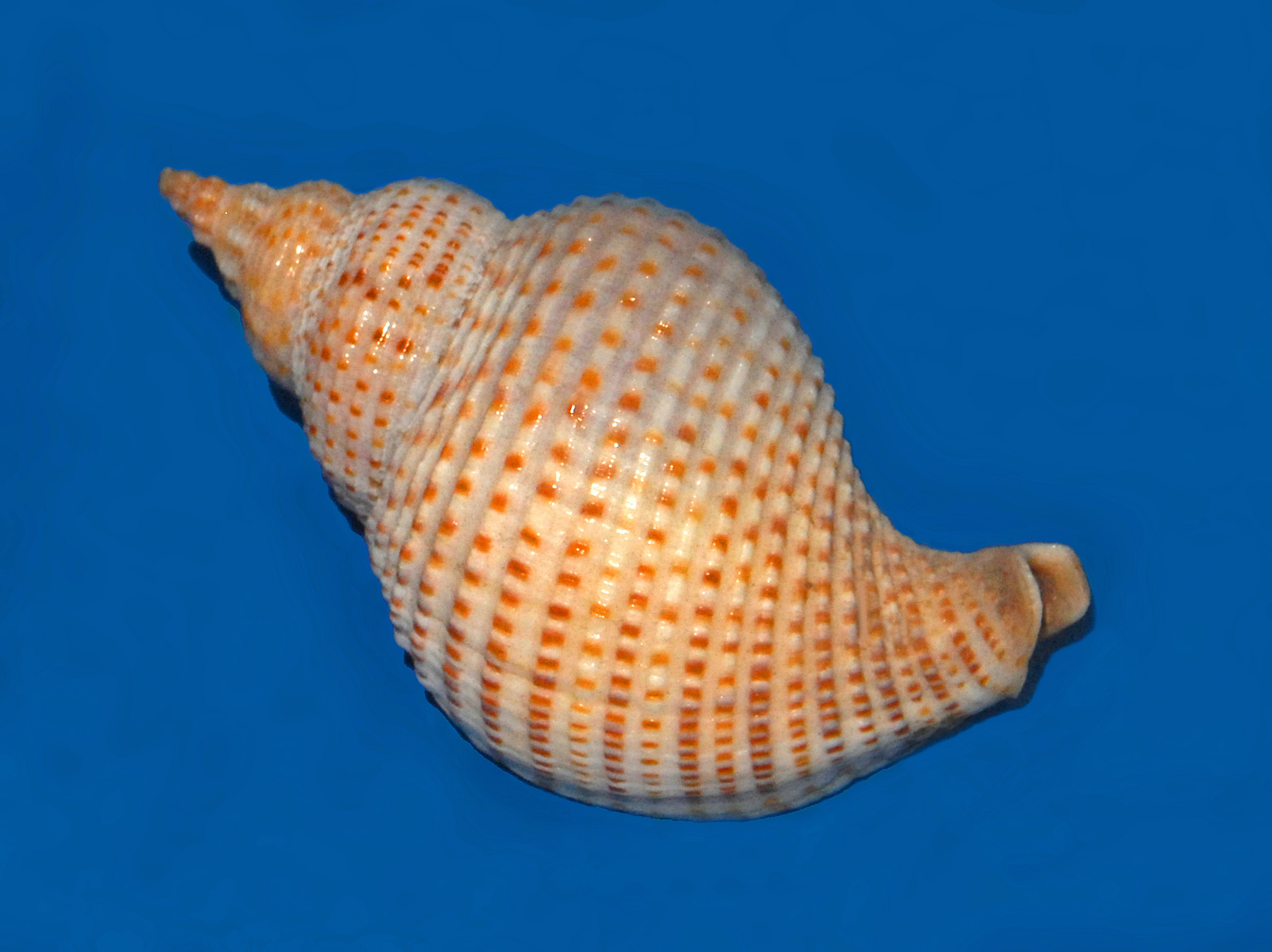
- Shell of Siphonalia pfefferi from Japan at the Museo Civico di Storia Naturale di Milano

Scientific classification
- Kingdom: Animalia
- Phylum: Mollusca
- Class: Gastropoda
- Subclass: Caenogastropoda
- Order: Neogastropoda
- Superfamily: Buccinoidea
- Family: Buccinidae
- Genus: Siphonalia; A. Adams, 1863

Type species
- Buccinum cassidariaeforme Reeve, 1846

= Siphonalia =

Genus of gastropods

Siphonalia is a genus of sea snails, marine gastropod molluscs in the subfamily Siphonaliinae of the family Buccinidae, the true whelks.

== Species ==
As of 3 January 2021, species with valid names within the genus Siphonalia include:

- † Siphonalia arctata Staadt, 1913
- † Siphonalia ariejansseni Schnetler, 2001
- Siphonalia aspersa Kuroda & Habe in Habe, 1961
- † Siphonalia bervillei (Deshayes, 1864)
- Siphonalia borshengjungi K.-Y. Lai, 2019
- Siphonalia callizona Kuroda & Habe in Habe, 1961
- Siphonalia cassidariaeformis (Reeve, 1846)
- Siphonalia concinna A. Adams, 1863
- Siphonalia dilatata J.W. Broomhead, 2001 (homonym of Siphonalia dilatata Suter, 1913)
- Siphonalia fuscolineata (Pease, 1860)
- Siphonalia fusoides (Reeve, 1846)
- Siphonalia hinnulus (A. Adams & Reeve, 1850)
- Siphonalia hirasei Kuroda & Habe in Habe, 1961
- Siphonalia kikaigashimana Hirase, 1908
- Siphonalia kuronoi T. C. Lan & Goto, 2004
- Siphonalia leei S.-Q. Zhang & S.-P. Zhang, 2018
- Siphonalia longirostris Dunker, 1882: synonym of Siphonalia fusoides (Reeve, 1846)
- Siphonalia marybethi Parth, 1996
- Siphonalia mikado Melvill, 1888
- Siphonalia minor S.-Q. Zhang, S.-P. Zhang & C.-Y. Lee, 2021
- Siphonalia modificata (Reeve, 1846)
- Siphonalia morteni Schnetler & M. S. Nielsen, 2018 †
- Siphonalia nanshaensis S.-Q. Zhang & S.-P. Zhang, 2018
- Siphonalia nigrobrunnea C.-Y. Lee & C.-L. Chen, 2010
- Siphonalia pfefferi G. B. Sowerby III, 1900
- Siphonalia pseudobuccinum Melvill, 1888: synonym of Siphonalia modificata (Reeve, 1846) (junior synonym)
- Siphonalia riparia Lozouet, 1999 †
- Siphonalia signum (Reeve, 1846)
- Siphonalia spadicea (Reeve, 1847)
- Siphonalia teres S.-Q. Zhang, S.-P. Zhang & C.-Y. Lee, 2021
- Siphonalia trochulus (Reeve, 1843)
- Siphonalia vanattai Pilsbry, 1905

Species brought into synonymy

- Siphonalia cassidariaeforme [sic]: synonym of Siphonalia cassidariaeformis (Reeve, 1846)
- Siphonalia clarkei Tenison Woods, 1876: synonym of Tasmeuthria clarkei (Tenison Woods, 1876) (original combination)
- Siphonalia colus A. Adams, 1863: synonym of Siphonalia modificata (Reeve, 1846) (junior synonym)
- Siphonalia dilatata Suter, 1913: synonym of Penion cuvierianus (Powell, 1927)
- Siphonalia elegans Suter, 1917: synonym of Aeneator elegans (Suter, 1917) (original combination)
- Siphonalia hyperodon Pilsbry, 1895: synonym of Siphonalia mikado Melvill, 1888
- Siphonalia kelletti [sic]: synonym of Kelletia kelletii (Forbes, 1852) (superseded combination)
- Siphonalia laddi MacNeil, 1961: synonym of Manaria kuroharai Azuma, 1960
- Siphonalia longirostris Dunker, 1882: synonym of Siphonalia fusoides (Reeve, 1846)
- Siphonalia lubrica Dall, 1918: synonym of Siphonofusus lubricus (Dall, 1918) (original combination)
- Siphonalia maxima Tryon, 1881: synonym of Penion maximus (Tryon, 1881) (original combination)
- Siphonalia modificatum [sic] : synonym of Siphonalia modificata (Reeve, 1846)
- Siphonalia nodosa (Martyn, 1784): synonym of Austrofusus glans (Röding, 1798)
- Siphonalia oligostira Tate, 1891: synonym of Penion mandarinus (Duclos, 1832)
- Siphonalia pallida (Broderip & G. B. Sowerby, 1829): synonym of Solenosteira pallida (Broderip & G. B. Sowerby, 1829)
- Siphonalia pfeifferi [sic]: synonym of Siphonalia pfefferi G.B. Sowerby I, 1900
- Siphonalia pseudobuccinum Melvill, 1888: synonym of Siphonalia modificata (Reeve, 1846) (junior synonym)
- † Siphonalia riparia Lozouet, 1999: synonym of † Oligonalia riparia (Lozouet, 1999)
- Siphonalia semiplicata Pilsbry, 1896: synonym of Siphonalia fusoides (Reeve, 1846)
- Siphonalia signa (Reeve, 1846): synonym of Siphonalia signum (Reeve, 1846) (signum is a noun in apposition [meaning flag or banner] and does not agree in gender with the genus it is combined with)
- Siphonalia stearnsii Pilsbry, 1895: synonym of Siphonalia pseudobuccinum Melvill, 1888
- Siphonalia subdilatata T.-C. Yen, 1936: synonym of Neptunea subdilatata (T.-C. Yen, 1936) (original combination)>
- Siphonalia trochula (Reeve, 1846): synonym of Siphonalia trochulus (Reeve, 1846) (wrong gender agreement of specific epithet; trochulus is a noun in apposition)
- Siphonalia turrita Tenison Woods, 1876: synonym of Tasmeuthria clarkei (Tenison Woods, 1876)>

Taxa inquirenda

- Siphonalia commoda A. Adams, 1863
- Siphonalia conspersa A. Adams, 1863
- Siphonalia corrugata A. Adams, 1863
