= Penion haweraensis =

Penion haweraensis Temporal range: late Pliocene
- Holotype from Auckland War Memorial Museum

Scientific classification
- Kingdom: Animalia
- Phylum: Mollusca
- Class: Gastropoda
- Subclass: Caenogastropoda
- Order: Neogastropoda
- Family: Austrosiphonidae
- Genus: Penion
- Species: P. haweraensis

Binomial name
- Penion haweraensis (A. W. B. Powell, 1931)

Synonyms
- Aeneator contractus Laws, 1940; Austrosipho (Verconella) haweraensis A. W. B. Powell, 1931

Extinct species of gastropod

Penion haweraensis is an extinct species of sea snail, a marine gastropod mollusc in the family Austrosiphonidae. Fossils of the species date to late Pliocene strata of the Tangahoe Formation in New Zealand.

== Description ==
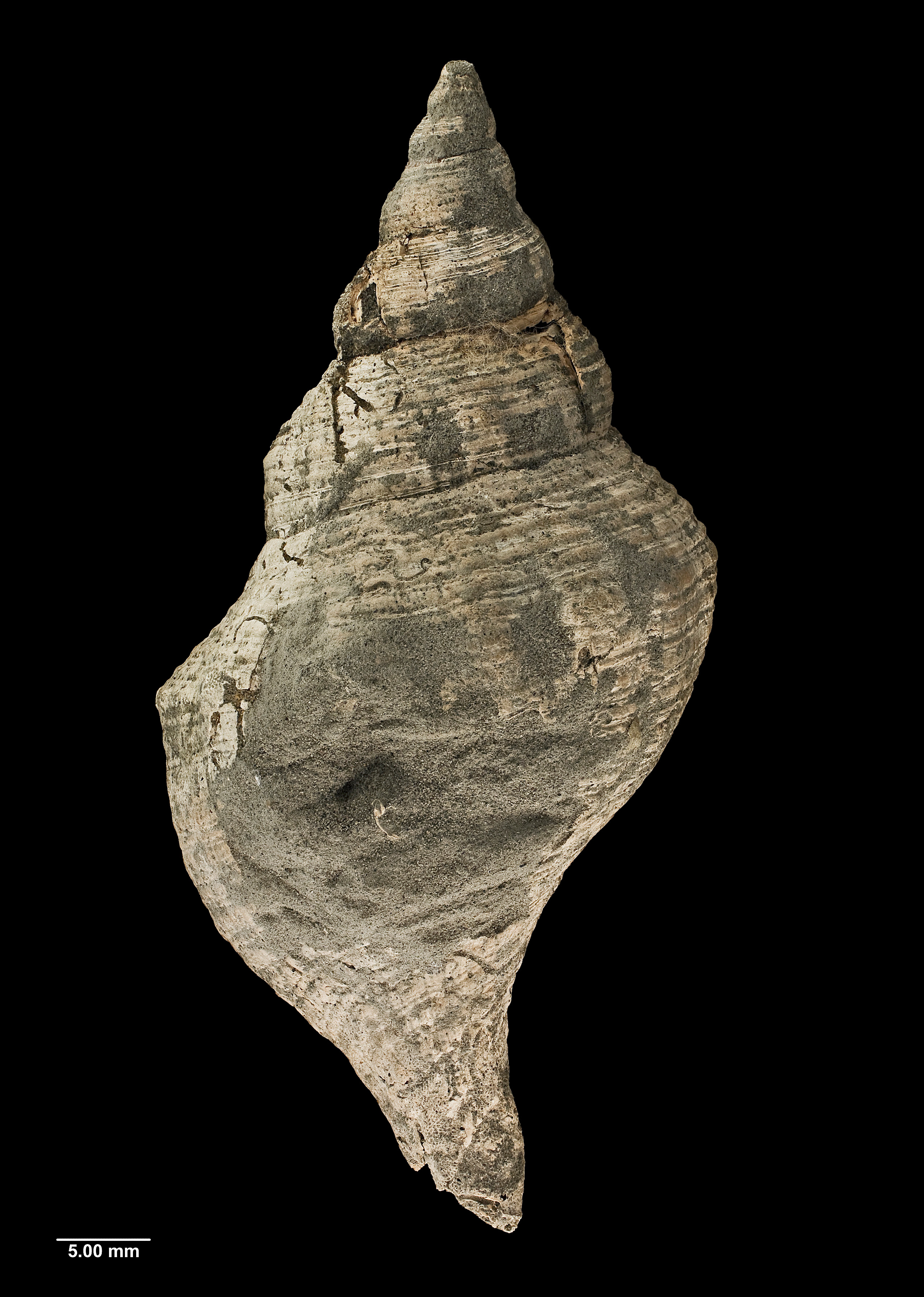
Reverse view of holotype

In the original description, Powell described the species as follows:

The fossil species is most distinctive in its early whorls, which are crossed by distant broad axial folds, nine to thirteen per whorl. These persist over all the post-nuclear whorls, although subobsolete in development. Typical mandarina never has axials on the later whorls, although there are from eighteen to twenty-one closely spaced axial folds on the early spire whorls. Whorls estimated at about nine. The protoconch is missing in the holotype, but a paratype shows a well preserved nucleus of three whorls...the spiral cords, which number nine on the penultimate and about twenty-four on the body-whorl, show a tendency to widen rather than to become prominently elevated, as in mandarina. The true outline of the Hawera species is a little narrower than shown in the holotype, which has been subjected to dorso-ventral pressure in the matrix.

The holotype of the species has an estimated height of 123 mm (4.8 in), and a diameter of 58 mm (2.3 in). It can be distinguished from P. mandarinus due to having nine primary cords and one thread per interspace on the penultimate whorl, compared to 10-12 primary spiral cords and between 2-6 spiral threads per interspace in P. mandarinus.

== Taxonomy ==
The species was first described by A. W. B. Powell in 1931, who named the species Austrosipho (Verconella) haweraensis. As Austrosipho was synonymised with Penion in 1930, the current accepted name for the species is Penion haweraensis. Powell believed that the species was ancestral to P. mandarinus, due to similarities in form and size, but differentiated the species based on sculpture detail differences. In 1973, A. G. Beu synonymised Aeneator contractus with the species, finding that A. contractus was a juvenile form of the species.

The holotype was collected in January 1931 from near the mouth of Waihi Stream near Hāwera, Taranaki, and is held in the collections of Auckland War Memorial Museum.

== Distribution ==
This extinct marine species occurs in late Pliocene (Waipipian) strata of the Tangahoe Formation, primarily associated with the Taranaki and Manawatū–Whanganui regions of New Zealand. Fossils of the species have been found near Hāwera, South Taranaki, Martinborough in the South Wairarapa District, and near Masterton in the Masterton District.
