= Macron mcleani =

Scientific classification
- Kingdom: Animalia
- Phylum: Mollusca
- Class: Gastropoda
- Subclass: Caenogastropoda
- Order: Neogastropoda
- Family: incertae sedis
- Genus: Macron
- Species: M. mcleani

Binomial name
- Macron mcleani Vermeij, 1998

Species of gastropod

Macron mcleani is a species of sea snail, a marine gastropod mollusc in the superfamily Buccinoidea.
