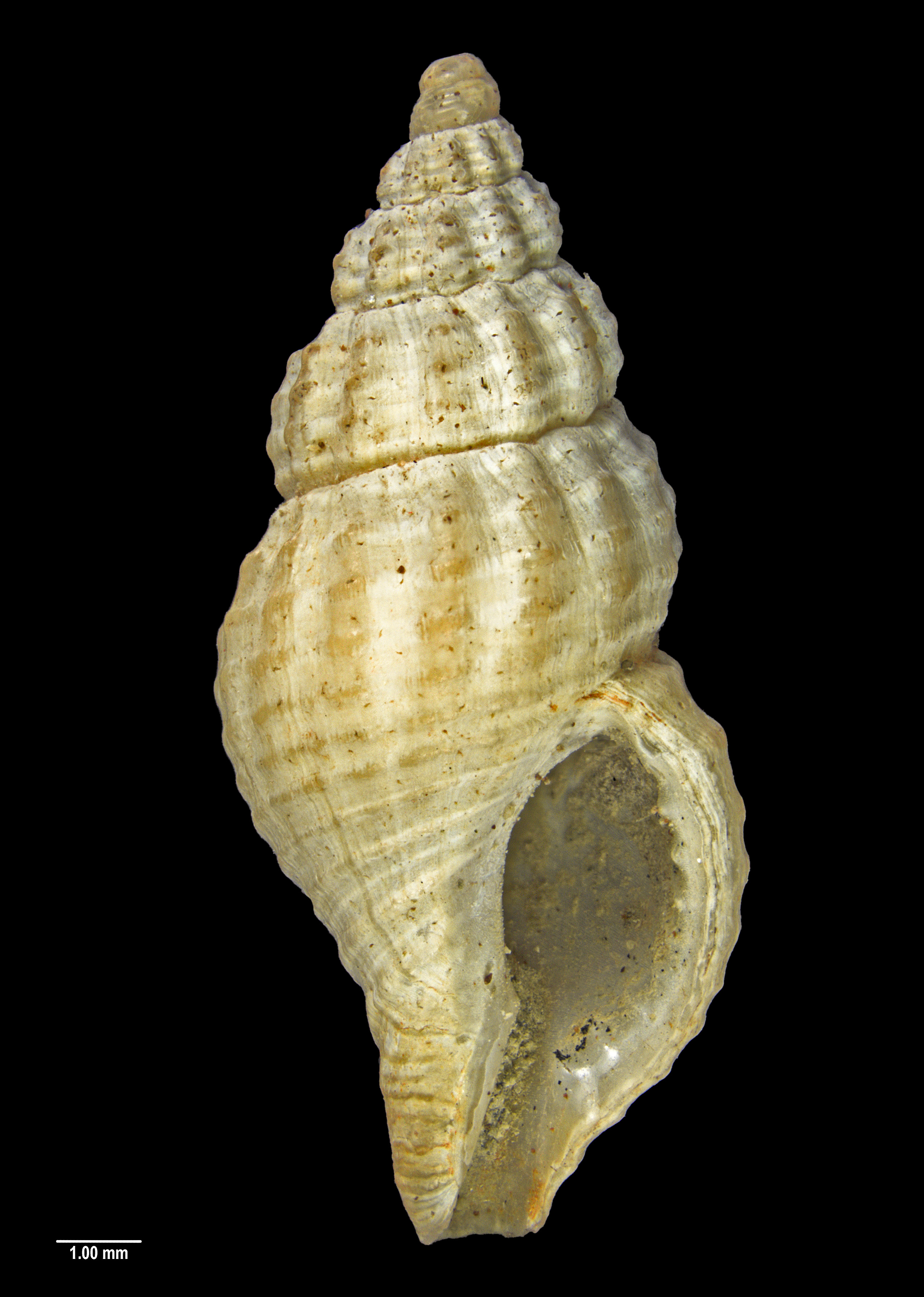
- Holotype from the Auckland War Memorial Museum

Scientific classification
- Domain: Eukaryota
- Kingdom: Animalia
- Phylum: Mollusca
- Class: Gastropoda
- Subclass: Caenogastropoda
- Order: Neogastropoda
- Family: Buccinidae
- Genus: Euthrenopsis
- Species: E. venusta

Binomial name
- Euthrenopsis venusta (Powell, 1929)

= Euthrenopsis venusta =

Species of gastropod

Euthrenopsis venusta is a species of marine gastropod mollusc in the family Buccinidae. It was first described by Baden Powell in 1929. It is endemic to the waters of New Zealand.

== Description ==
Euthrenopsis bountyensis has a shell with six whorls, with strong and even convex outlines.

== Distribution ==
The species is Endemic to New Zealand. The holotype was collected off the coast of the Otago Region, close to Oamaru. Euthrenopsis venusta specimens have also been discovered east of the Otago Peninsula, overlapping with the range of Euthrenopsis otagoensis. Euthrenopsis venusta is the only species from the genus that has been recorded as occurring in the bathyal zone.
