= Ptychosalpinx globulus =

Scientific classification
- Kingdom: Animalia
- Phylum: Mollusca
- Class: Gastropoda
- Subclass: Caenogastropoda
- Order: Neogastropoda
- Family: incertae sedis
- Genus: Ptychosalpinx
- Species: P. globulus

Binomial name
- Ptychosalpinx globulus (Dall, 1889)

Synonyms
- Chrysodomus (Sipho) globulus Dall, 1889; Chrysodomus globulus Dall, 1889 (original combination)

Species of gastropod

Ptychosalpinx globulus is a species of sea snail, a marine gastropod mollusc in the superfamily Buccinoidea.
