= Fascinus typicus =

Scientific classification
- Kingdom: Animalia
- Phylum: Mollusca
- Class: Gastropoda
- Subclass: Caenogastropoda
- Order: Neogastropoda
- Family: incertae sedis
- Genus: Fascinus
- Species: F. typicus

Binomial name
- Fascinus typicus Hedley, 1903

Species of gastropod

Fascinus typicus is a species of sea snail, a marine gastropod mollusc in the superfamily Buccinoidea.
