= Jerrybuccinum malvinense =

Scientific classification
- Kingdom: Animalia
- Phylum: Mollusca
- Class: Gastropoda
- Subclass: Caenogastropoda
- Order: Neogastropoda
- Family: incertae sedis
- Genus: Jerrybuccinum
- Species: J. malvinense

Binomial name
- Jerrybuccinum malvinense Kantor & Pastorino, 2009

Species of gastropod

Jerrybuccinum malvinense is a species of sea snail, a marine gastropod mollusc, in the superfamily Buccinoidea, the true whelks.
