= Jerrybuccinum explorator =

Scientific classification
- Kingdom: Animalia
- Phylum: Mollusca
- Class: Gastropoda
- Subclass: Caenogastropoda
- Order: Neogastropoda
- Family: incertae sedis
- Genus: Jerrybuccinum
- Species: J. explorator

Binomial name
- Jerrybuccinum explorator Fraussen & Sellanes, 2008

Synonyms
- Kryptos explorator

Species of gastropod

Jerrybuccinum explorator is a species of sea snail, a marine gastropod mollusc in the superfamily Buccinoidea, the true whelks.
