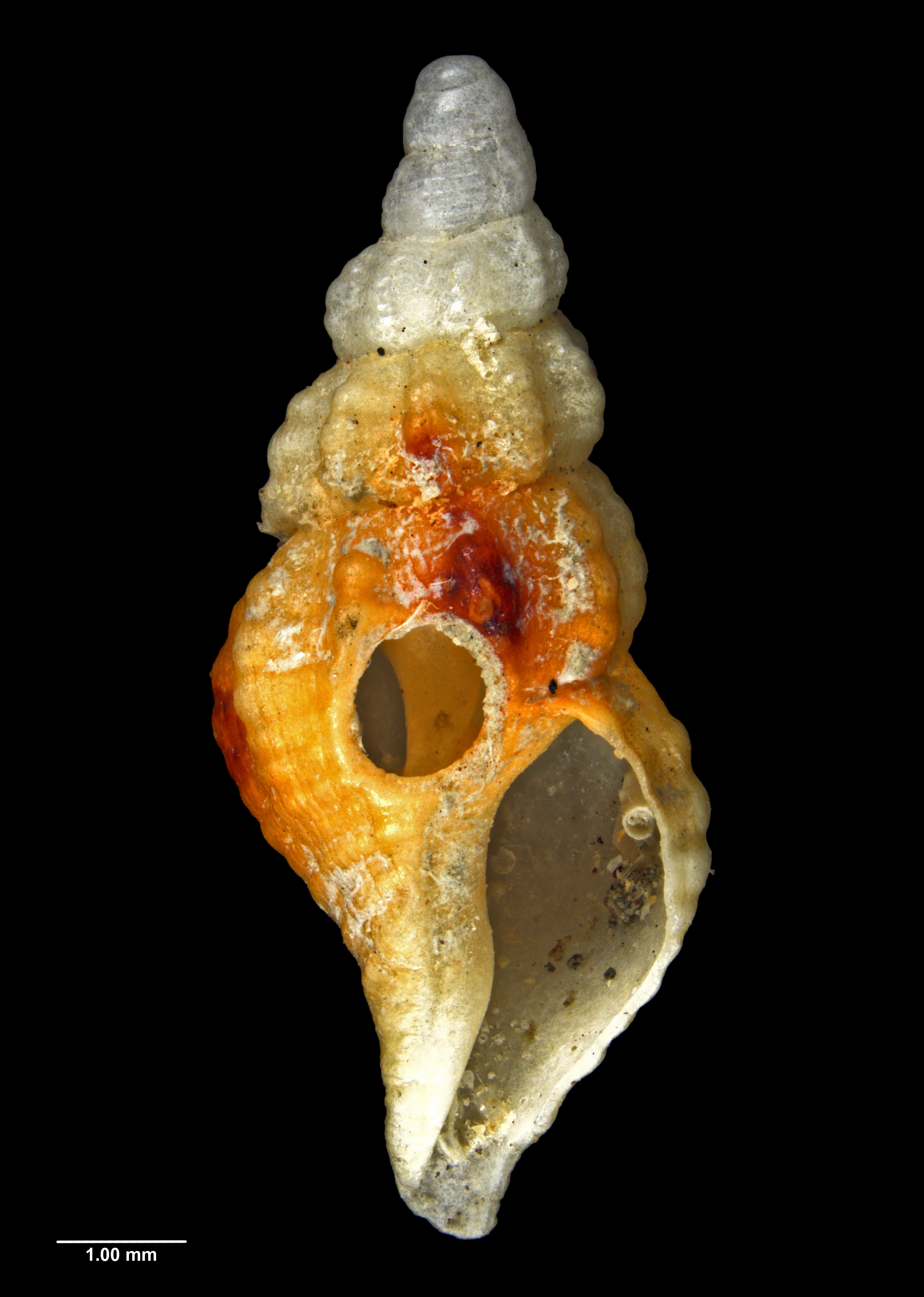
- Holotype from the Auckland War Memorial Museum

Scientific classification
- Domain: Eukaryota
- Kingdom: Animalia
- Phylum: Mollusca
- Class: Gastropoda
- Subclass: Caenogastropoda
- Order: Neogastropoda
- Family: Buccinidae
- Genus: Euthrenopsis
- Species: E. bountyensis

Binomial name
- Euthrenopsis bountyensis (Powell, 1929)

= Euthrenopsis bountyensis =

Species of gastropod

Euthrenopsis bountyensis is a species of marine gastropod mollusc in the family Buccinidae. It was first described by Baden Powell in 1929. It is endemic to the waters of New Zealand.

== Description ==
Euthrenopsis bountyensis has a shell with six whorls, with strong and even convex outlines. The species measures 9mm by 4mm.

== Distribution ==
The species is Endemic to New Zealand. The holotype and juvenile paratypes were collected from the Bounty Islands. A similar specimen was collected from the waters of the Antipodes Islands in 1967.
