= Siphonalia kuronoi =

Scientific classification
- Kingdom: Animalia
- Phylum: Mollusca
- Class: Gastropoda
- Subclass: Caenogastropoda
- Order: Neogastropoda
- Family: Buccinidae
- Genus: Siphonalia
- Species: S. kuronoi

Binomial name
- Siphonalia kuronoi T.C. Lan & Yoshihiro Goto, 2004

Species of gastropod

Siphonalia kuronoi is a species of sea snail, a marine gastropod mollusc in the family Buccinidae, the true whelks.
