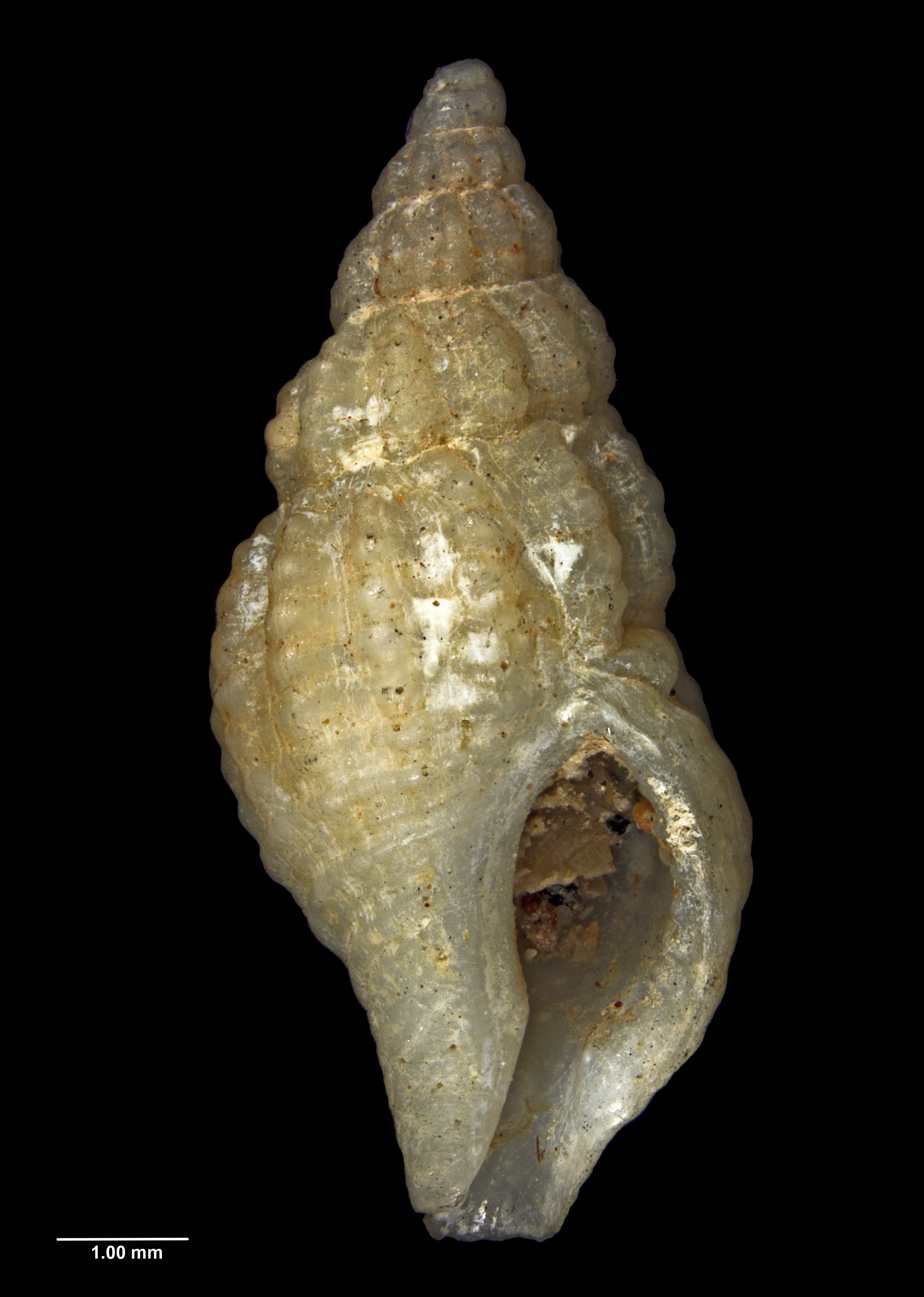
- Euthrenopsis otagoensis

Scientific classification
- Kingdom: Animalia
- Phylum: Mollusca
- Class: Gastropoda
- Subclass: Caenogastropoda
- Order: Neogastropoda
- Superfamily: Buccinoidea
- Family: Buccinidae
- Genus: Euthrenopsis; Powell, 1929

Type species
- Euthrenopsis otagoensis (Powell, 1929)

= Euthrenopsis =

Genus of gastropods

Euthrenopsis is a genus of sea snails, marine gastropod mollusks in the temporary family Buccinoidea incertae sedis.

All species in the family are endemic to the waters of New Zealand.

== Species ==
Species within the genus Euthrenopsis include:

- Euthrenopsis bountyensis Powell, 1929
- Euthrenopsis otagoensis Powell, 1929
- Euthrenopsis venusta Powell, 1929
