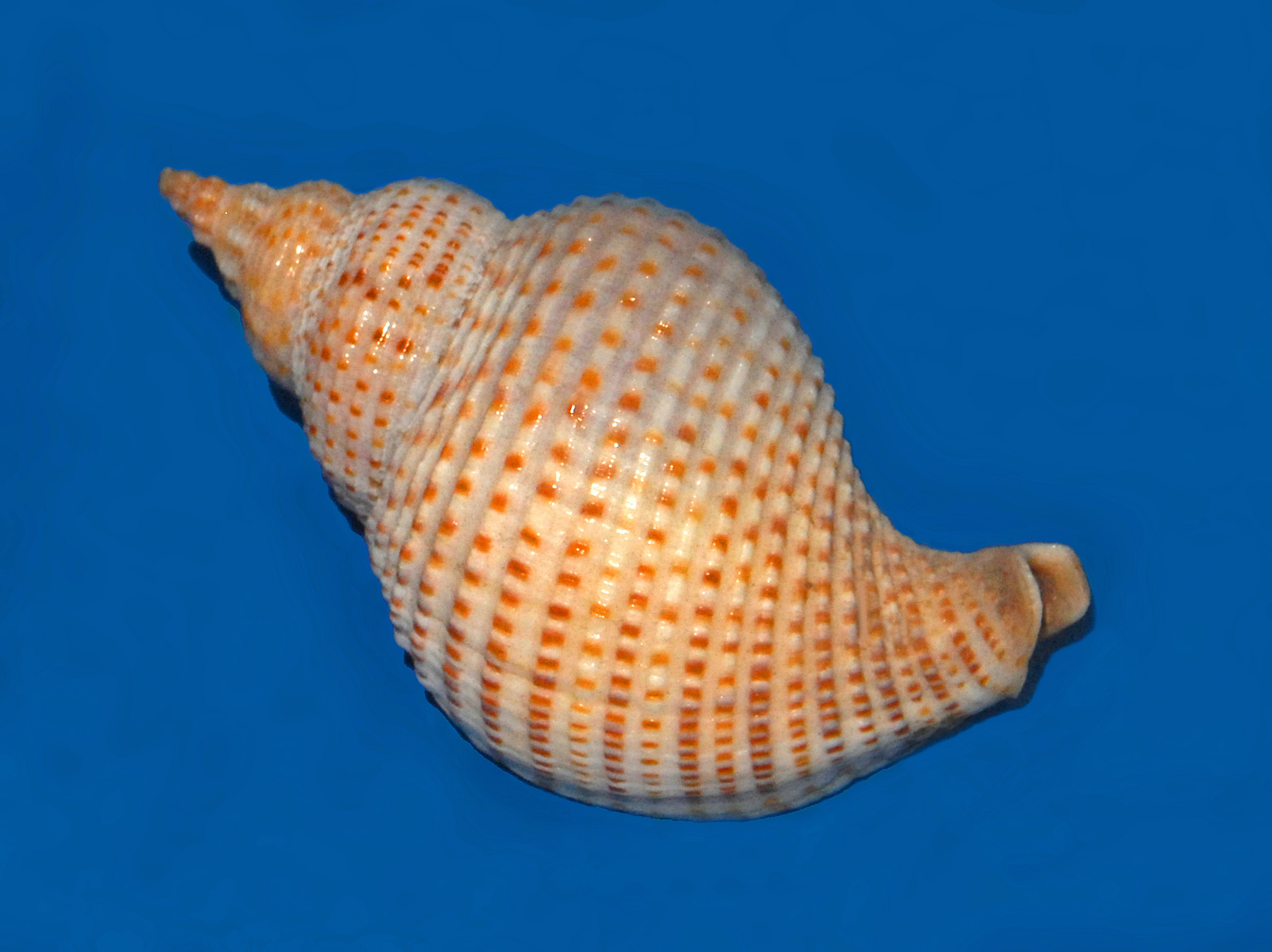
- Shell of Siphonalia pfefferi from Japan at the Museo Civico di Storia Naturale di Milano

Scientific classification
- Kingdom: Animalia
- Phylum: Mollusca
- Class: Gastropoda
- Subclass: Caenogastropoda
- Order: Neogastropoda
- Family: Buccinidae
- Genus: Siphonalia
- Species: S. pfefferi

Binomial name
- Siphonalia pfefferi G.B. Sowerby, 1900

= Siphonalia pfefferi =

Species of gastropod

Siphonalia pfefferi, common name Pfeffer's whelk, is a species of sea snail, a marine gastropod mollusc in the family Buccinidae, the true whelks.

== Description ==
Siphonalia pfefferi has a shell that reaches a length of 40–50 mm. The shape of this shell is ovate, with several prominent ribs per whorl and a siphonal canal slightly recurved. The surface has a white or cream-yellow background color, with small orange or pale brown spots. Interior has an orange coloration, with white inner lip of the aperture.

== Distribution ==
This species is endemic to southern Japan, mainly in Kii Peninsula and southward.

== Habitat ==
It lives on sandy bottoms, at a depth of 10–50 m.
