= Siphonalia vanattai =

- Shell of Siphonalia vanattai (original image)

Scientific classification
- Kingdom: Animalia
- Phylum: Mollusca
- Class: Gastropoda
- Subclass: Caenogastropoda
- Order: Neogastropoda
- Family: Buccinidae
- Genus: Siphonalia
- Species: S. vanattai

Binomial name
- Siphonalia vanattai Pilsbry, 1905

Species of gastropod

Siphonalia vanattai is a species of sea snail, a marine gastropod mollusc in the family Buccinidae, the true whelks.

== Description ==
The length of the shell attains 28 mm; diameter 15 mm; aperture to the end of the siphonal canal 19 mm

(Original description) The shell is obesely fusiform, with its greatest width situated approximately at the median level. It is solid and strong, white, and irregularly marked with dull purplish-brown spots of irregular shape, as well as with narrow reddish-brown spiral lines. These lines are most distinct behind the lip; there are six, equidistant lines, or fewer where some are omitted.

There are six whorls, although the protoconch is lost in the specimens examined. The whorls are longitudinally costate, with 13 to 15 rounded ribs on the body whorl. These ribs are most prominent at the shoulder, rapidly diminish below it, and do not extend onto the base. The surface is sculptured throughout with rounded spiral cords, with threads occasionally interposed between them.

The last two whorls are subangular at the shoulder, whereas the preceding whorls are very convex. The body whorl is strongly contracted below. The aperture is oblique, and its length, including the anterior canal, is about two thirds that of the shell. Internally, it is pale, dull reddish brown, becoming ochre-flesh-coloured between the lirae and pure white along the bevelled edge. The interior is rather sharply sulcate.

The outer lip is symmetrically arched. The anterior canal is deep and moderately recurved.

== Distribution ==
This marine species is endemic to Japan.
