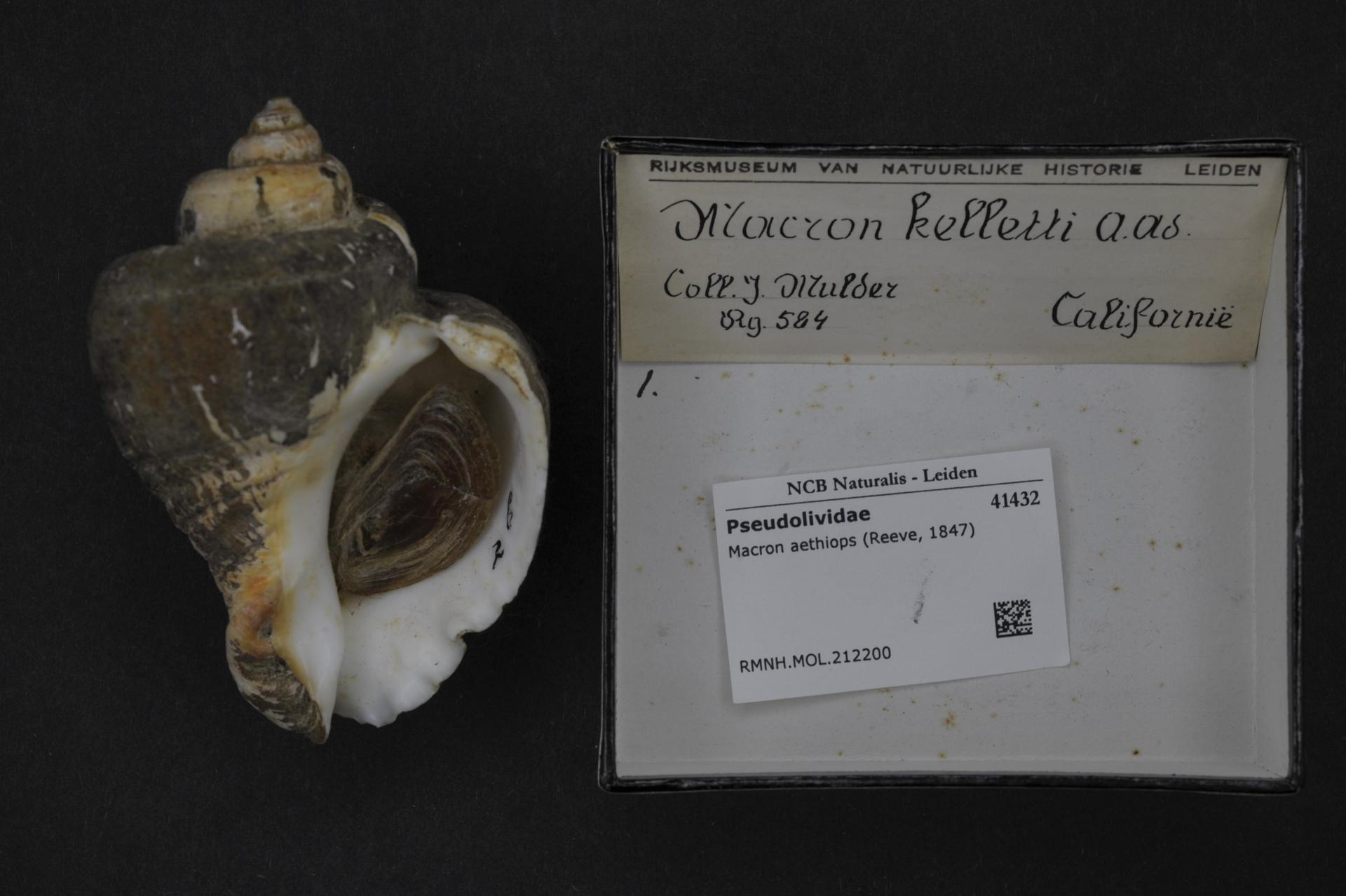
- Macron aethiops

Scientific classification
- Kingdom: Animalia
- Phylum: Mollusca
- Class: Gastropoda
- Subclass: Caenogastropoda
- Order: Neogastropoda
- Superfamily: Buccinoidea
- Family: incertae sedis
- Genus: Macron; H. Adams & A. Adams, 1853

Synonyms
- Macroniscus Thiele, 1929; Pseudoliva (Macron) H. Adams & A. Adams, 1853 ·

= Macron (gastropod) =

Genus of gastropods

Macron is a genus of sea snails, marine gastropod molluscs unassigned in the superfamily Buccinoidea.

== Description ==
The callus of the inner lip is defined. The columella is obliquely wrinkled. The spire is elevated with the suture channelled.

== Species ==
Species within the genus Macron include:

- Macron aethiops (Reeve, 1847) Pacific coast of Mexico
- † Macron escalonia (Vermeij & DeVries, 1997)
- Macron lividus (A. Adams, 1855) tide pools on the Southern California coast
- Macron mcleani Vermeij, 1998
- Macron orcutti Dall, 1918 Baja California coast
- † Macron vermeiji S. N. Nielsen & Frassinetti, 2003
- Macron wrightii H. Adams, 1865

Synonyms

- Macron stereoglypta (G. B. Sowerby III, 1882): synonym of Macron wrightii H. Adams, 1865
