= Ptychosalpinx =

Scientific classification
- Kingdom: Animalia
- Phylum: Mollusca
- Class: Gastropoda
- Subclass: Caenogastropoda
- Order: Neogastropoda
- Superfamily: Buccinoidea
- Family: incertae sedis
- Genus: Ptychosalpinx; Gill, 1867

Type species
- † Buccinum altile Conrad, 1832

Genus of large sea snails

Ptychosalpinx is a genus of sea snails, marine gastropod molluscs in the superfamily Buccinoidea. Some sources place it in the family Buccinidae, the true whelks.

== Species ==
Species within the genus Ptychosalpinx include:

- Ptychosalpinx altilis † (Conrad, 1832)
- Ptychosalpinx globulus (Dall, 1889)
