= Chickcharnea =

Scientific classification
- Kingdom: Animalia
- Phylum: Mollusca
- Class: Gastropoda
- Subclass: Caenogastropoda
- Order: Neogastropoda
- Superfamily: Buccinoidea
- Family: incertae sedis
- Genus: Chickcharnea; Petuch, 2002

Type genus
- Chickcharnea fragilis Petuch, 2002

Genus of gastropods

Chickcharnea is a monotypic genus in the family Buccinidae, the true whelks, containing one species of sea snail, a marine gastropod mollusk, Chickcharnea fragilis.
