= Fax (gastropod) =

Scientific classification
- Kingdom: Animalia
- Phylum: Mollusca
- Class: Gastropoda
- Subclass: Caenogastropoda
- Order: Neogastropoda
- Superfamily: Buccinoidea
- Family: incertae sedis
- Genus: Fax; Iredale, 1925

Type species
- Phos tabidus Hedley, 1904

Synonyms
- Scaeofax Iredale, 1931

Genus of gastropods

Fax is a genus of sea snails, marine gastropod mollusks in the superfamily Buccinoidea.

== Species ==
- Fax grandior (Verco, 1908)
- Fax molleri (Iredale, 1931)
- Fax tabidus (Hedley, 1904)
- Fax tenuicostatus (Tenison Woods, 1877)

Synonyms

- Fax alertae Dell, 1956: synonym of Cominella (Eucominia) alertae (Dell, 1956) represented as Cominella alertae (Dell, 1956) (basionym)
- Fax mirabilis (Powell, 1929): synonym of Cominella (Eucominia) mirabilis mirabilis Powell, 1929 represented as Cominella mirabilis mirabilis Powell, 1929
- Fax powelli C. A. Fleming, 1948: synonym of Cominella (Eucominia) mirabilis powelli (C. A. Fleming, 1948) represented as Cominella mirabilis powelli (C. A. Fleming, 1948) (basionym)
