= Jerrybuccinum =

Scientific classification
- Kingdom: Animalia
- Phylum: Mollusca
- Class: Gastropoda
- Subclass: Caenogastropoda
- Order: Neogastropoda
- Superfamily: Buccinoidea
- Family: incertae sedis
- Genus: Jerrybuccinum; Kantor & Pastorino, 2009

Type species
- Jerrybuccinum malvinense Kantor & Pastorino, 2009

Genus of gastropods

Jerrybuccinum is a genus of sea snails, marine gastropod mollusks in the superfamily Buccinoidea.

== Species ==
Species within the genus Jerrybuccinum include:

- Jerrybuccinum malvinense Kantor & Pastorino, 2009
- Jerrybuccinum explorator (Fraussen & Sellanes, 2008)
