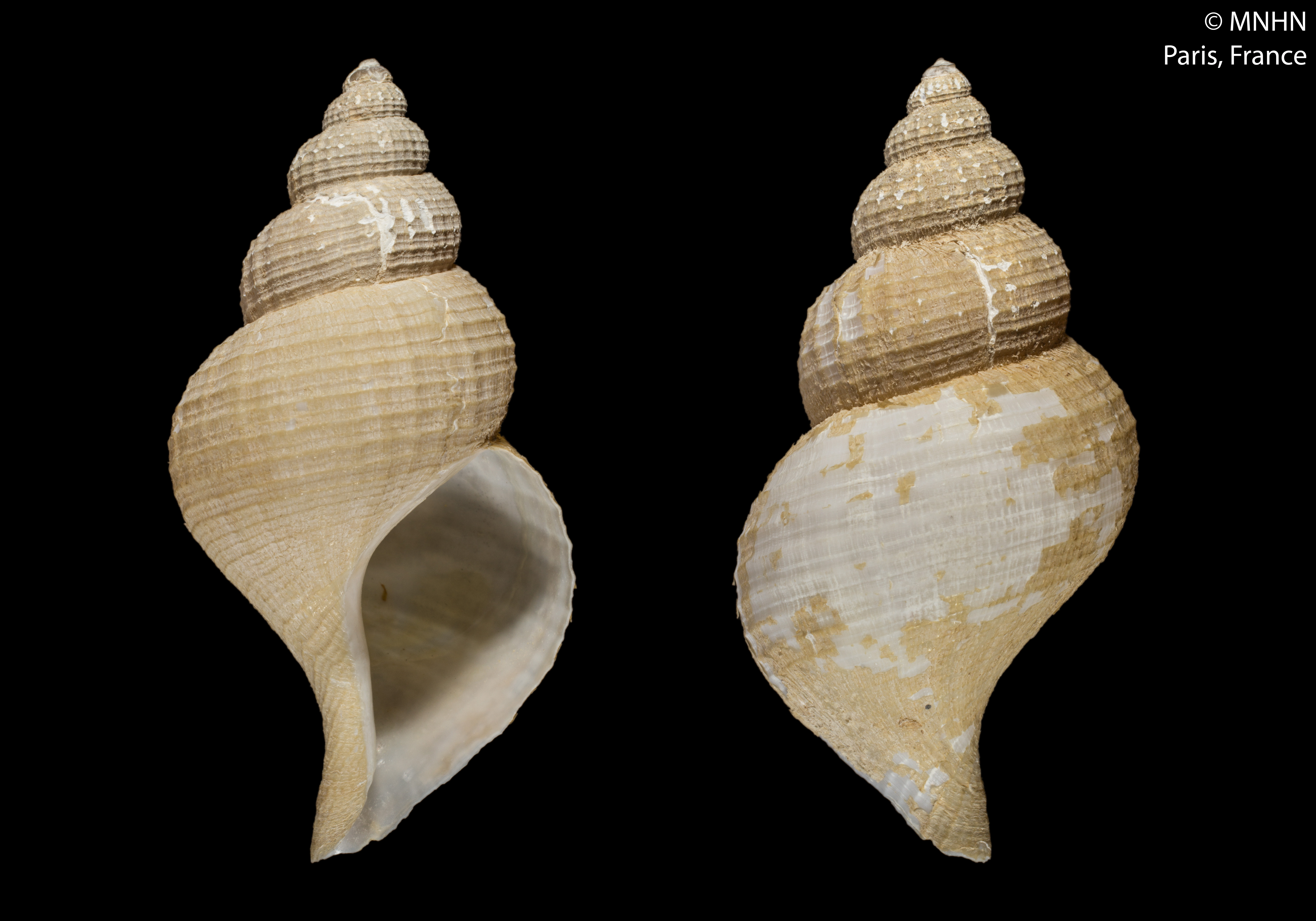
- Shell of Sagenotriton bathybius (holotype at MNHN, Paris)

Scientific classification
- Kingdom: Animalia
- Phylum: Mollusca
- Class: Gastropoda
- Subclass: Caenogastropoda
- Order: Neogastropoda
- Superfamily: Buccinoidea
- Family: incertae sedis
- Genus: Sagenotriton; B. A. Marshall & Walton, 2019

Type species
- Sagenotriton ajax B. A. Marshall & Walton, 2019

= Sagenotriton =

Genus of gastropods

Sagenotriton is a genus of sea snails, marine gastropod mollusks in the superfamily Buccinoidea.

== Species ==
- Sagenotriton ajax B. A. Marshall & Walton, 2019
- Sagenotriton bathybius (Bouchet & Warén, 1986)
- Sagenotriton bonaespei (Barnard, 1963)
