= Fascinus (gastropod) =

Scientific classification
- Kingdom: Animalia
- Phylum: Mollusca
- Class: Gastropoda
- Subclass: Caenogastropoda
- Order: Neogastropoda
- Superfamily: Buccinoidea
- Family: incertae sedis
- Genus: Fascinus; Hedley, 1903

Type species
- Fascinus typicus Hedley, 1903

Genus of gastropods

Gastropod Fasciolarka Gigantea

Fascinus is a genus of sea snails, marine gastropod mollusks in the superfamily Buccinoidea.

== Species ==
Species within the genus Fascinus include:

- Fascinus typicus Hedley, 1903
