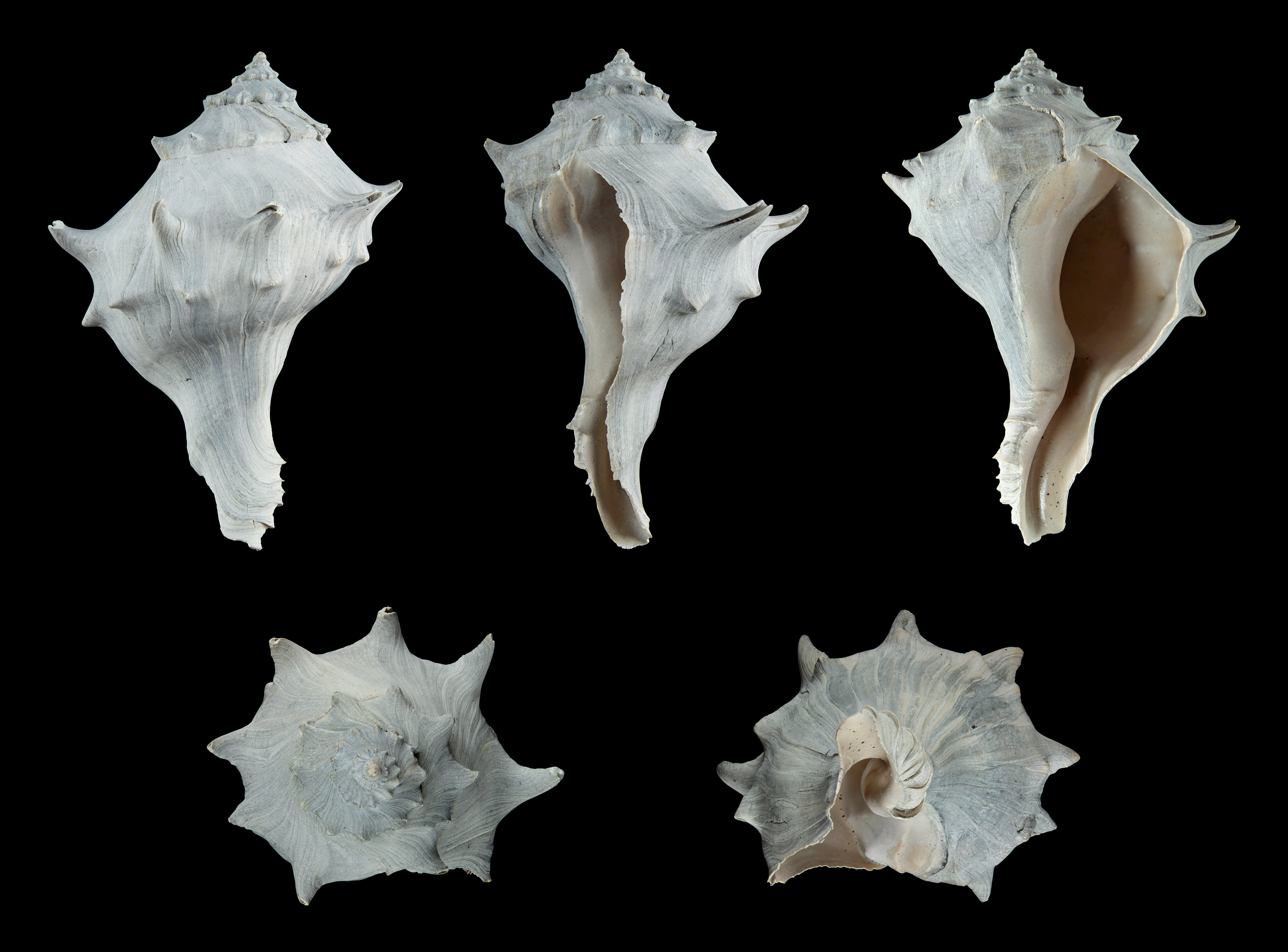
- Echinofulgur echinatum

Scientific classification
- Kingdom: Animalia
- Phylum: Mollusca
- Class: Gastropoda
- Subclass: Caenogastropoda
- Order: Neogastropoda
- Superfamily: Buccinoidea
- Family: †Echinofulguridae; Petuch, 1994

Synonyms
- † Echinofulgurinae Petuch, 1994 alternative representation; † Levifusinae Petuch, R. F. Myers & Berschauer, 2015 alternative representation; † Protobusyconinae Petuch, R. F. Myers & Berschauer, 2015 alternative representation

= Echinofulguridae =

Echinofulguridae Temporal range: Late Cretaceous–Early Pleistocene

Extinct family of predatory marine gastropods

Echinofulguridae is an extinct family of predatory marine gastropods within the superfamily Buccinoidea from the Late Cretaceous- Early Pleistocene of eastern North America. The family was first described by Petuch in 1994 and is considered by said author to be ancestral to the extant family Busyconidae.

== Description ==
The family comprises three genera per WoRMS, although the source describing Archefulgur also divides it into three subfamilies (see synonyms below). The author who named them, Petuch, diagnoses them as "small-to-medium sized gastropods with inflated, pyriform or fusiform shells, most often ornamented with two rows of spines or knobs, one around the mid-body and one around the shoulder; some species have only a single row of spines around the shoulder; shell surface smooth and silky or sculptured with numerous very fine spiral threads; siphonal canals elongated, narrow, separated from the body whorl by a distinct constriction; siphonal canals often ornamented with strong spiral cords or a single large scaly ridge; spire whorls generally elevated, protracted, or scalariform, most often ornamented with one or two rows of spines; parietal region glazed; apertures wide and flaring; protoconchs rounded, composed of two whorls."

== Genera ==
Genera within the family Echinofulguridae include:

- Archefulgur Petuch, R. F. Myers & Berschauer, 2015 †
- Echinofulgur Olsson & Harbison, 1953 †
- Levifusus Conrad, 1865 †

=== Synonyms ===
- † Surculofusus É. Vincent, 1895: synonym of † Levifusus Conrad, 1865
