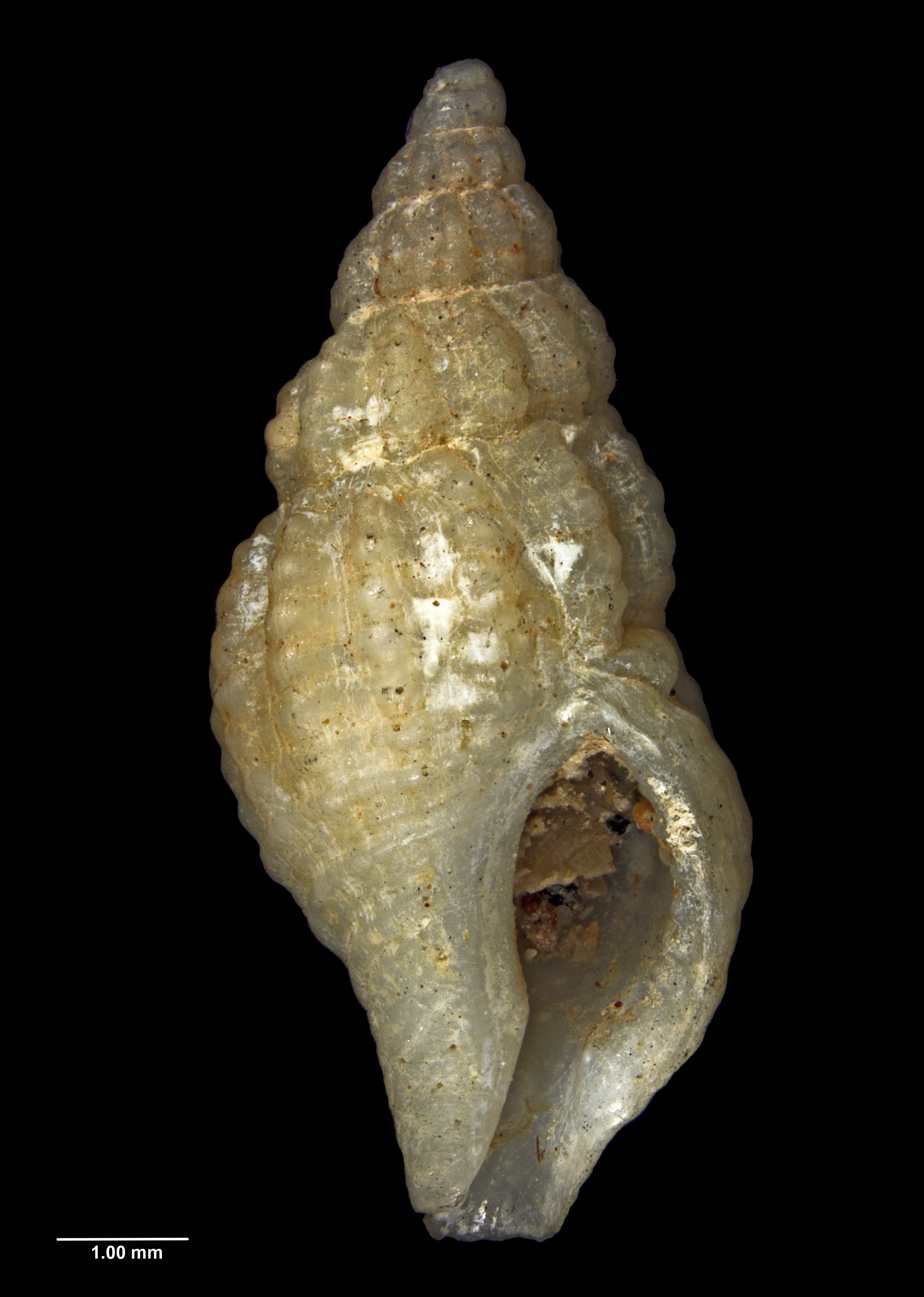
- Holotype from the Auckland War Memorial Museum

Scientific classification
- Domain: Eukaryota
- Kingdom: Animalia
- Phylum: Mollusca
- Class: Gastropoda
- Subclass: Caenogastropoda
- Order: Neogastropoda
- Family: Buccinidae
- Genus: Euthrenopsis
- Species: E. otagoensis

Binomial name
- Euthrenopsis otagoensis (Powell, 1929)

= Euthrenopsis otagoensis =

Species of gastropod

Euthrenopsis otagoensis is a species of marine gastropod mollusc in the family Buccinidae. It was first described by Baden Powell in 1929. It is endemic to the waters of New Zealand. It is the type species for the genus Euthrenopsis.

== Description ==
Euthrenopsis otagoensis has a shell with six whorls, with strong and even convex outlines. The species measures 12 mm by 5 mm.

== Distribution ==
The species is endemic to New Zealand. The holotype was collected in the waters east of the Taiaroa Head in the Otago Region of New Zealand. Additional specimens have been identified in the Foveaux Strait and the Cook Strait.
