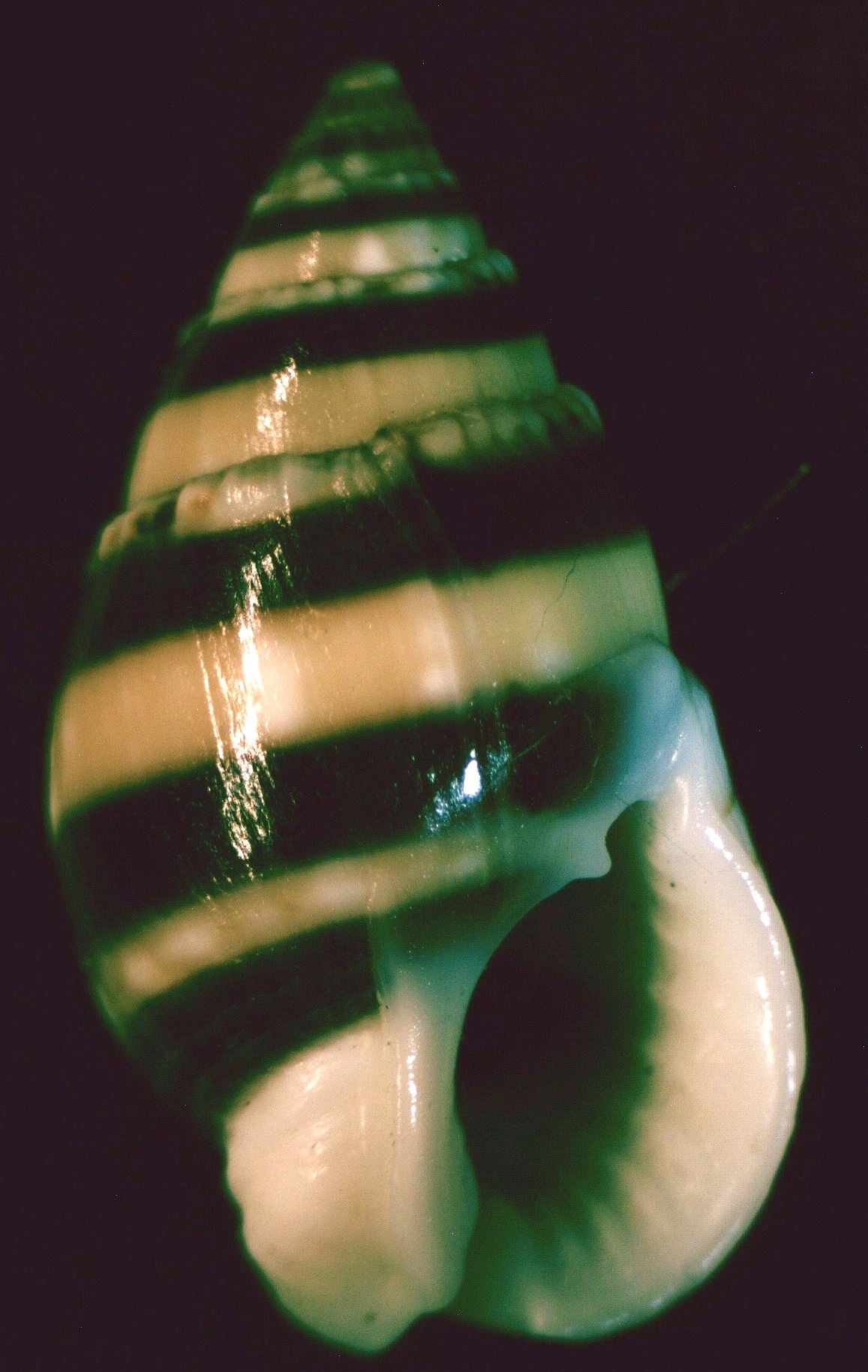

Scientific classification
- Kingdom: Animalia
- Phylum: Mollusca
- Class: Gastropoda
- Subclass: Caenogastropoda
- Order: Neogastropoda
- Family: Nassariidae
- Subfamily: Nassariinae
- Genus: Nassarius
- Species: N. reeveanus

Binomial name
- Nassarius reeveanus (Dunker, 1847)

Synonyms
- Buccinum (Bullia) velatum Gould, 1850; Buccinum reeveanum Dunker, 1847 (original combination); Nassa (Zeuxis) lentiginosa A. Adams, 1852; Nassa (Zeuxis) lentiginosa var. punctata A. Adams, 1852; Nassa filosa A. Adams, 1852; Nassa lentiginosa A. Adams, 1852; Nassa luctuosa A. Adams, 1852; Nassa mustelina Gould, 1860; Nassa punctata A. Adams, 1852; Nassa zonalis A. Adams, 1852; Nassarius (Telasco) reeveanus (Dunker, 1847) · accepted, alternate representation; Nassarius (Telasco) velatus (Gould, 1877); Nassarius (Zeuxis) lentiginosus (A. Adams, 1852); Nassarius (Zeuxis) velatus (Gould, 1877); Nassarius (Zeuxis) zonalis Kira, 1954; Nassarius (Telasco) reeveanus (Dunker, 1847); Nassarius lentiginosus (A. Adams, 1852); Nassarius zonalis (A. Adams, 1852); Tarazeuxis velatus (Gould, 1877); Zeuxis (Tarazeuxis) velatus (Gould, 1877); Zeuxis velatus (Gould, 1877)

= Nassarius reeveanus =

Species of gastropod

Nassarius reeveanus is a species of sea snail, a marine gastropod mollusk in the family Nassariidae.

== Description ==
The shell of Nassarius reeveanus ranges in size between 14 and 26 mm. It is patterned with alternating transversal bands of cream and black.

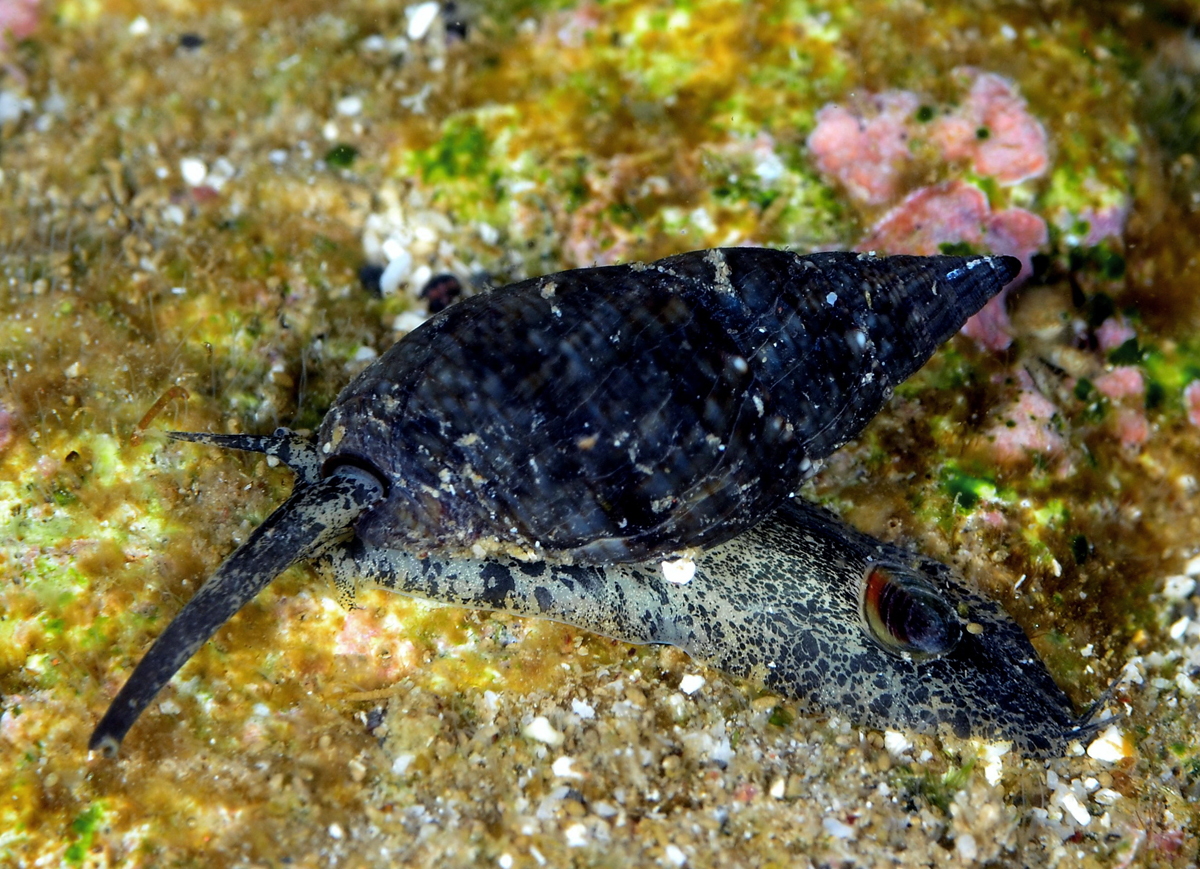
Nassarius reeveanus, a live specimen

== Distribution ==
Nassarius reeveanus is found in the Indo-Pacific and off Australia (Western Australia).
