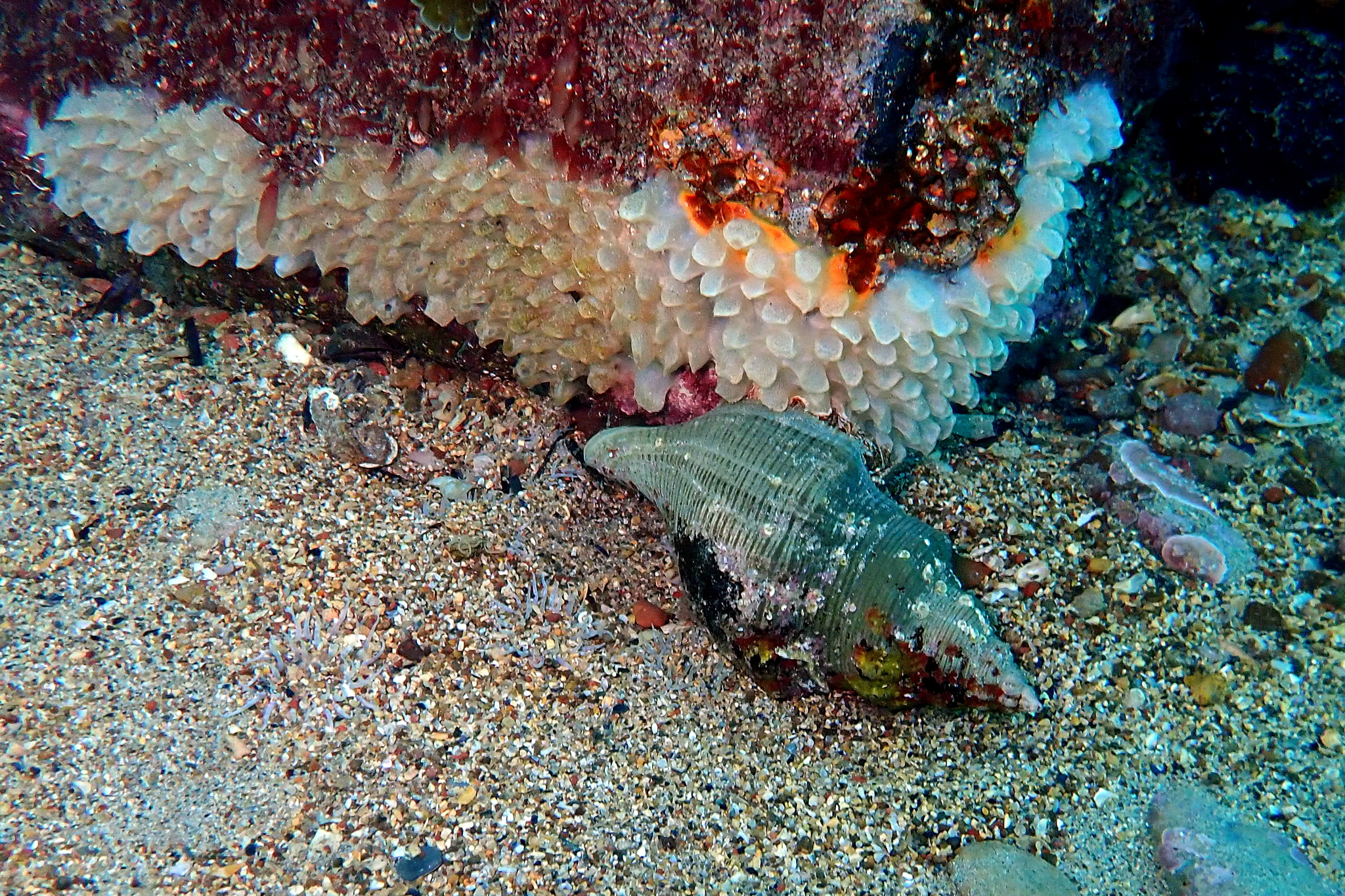
- Penion mandarinus with eggs at Kennon Cove in Flinders

Scientific classification
- Kingdom: Animalia
- Phylum: Mollusca
- Class: Gastropoda
- Subclass: Caenogastropoda
- Order: Neogastropoda
- Family: Austrosiphonidae
- Genus: Penion
- Species: P. mandarinus

Binomial name
- Penion mandarinus (Duclos, P.L., 1831)

Synonyms
- list of synonyms: Berylsma grandis (Gray, 1839); Berylsma grandis levifida Iredale, 1925; Fusus grandis Gray, 1839; Fusus mandarinus Duclos, 1832 (original combination); Fusus oligostira (Tate, 1891) (junior subjective synonym); Fusus pastinacea Reeve, 1848; Fusus tasmaniensis Adams & Angas, 1864; Fusus waitei Hedley, 1903; Largisipho oligostira (Tate, 1891); Largisipho oligostira spectanda Iredale, 1929; Penion sulcatus mandarinus (Duclos, 1832); Siphonalia oligostira Tate, 1891

= Penion mandarinus =

Species of gastropod

Penion mandarinus, common name the mandarin penion, southern siphon whelk or Waite's buccinum whelk, is a species of medium-to-large predatory sea snail or whelk, a marine gastropod mollusc in the family Austrosiphonidae.

== Description ==
Penion mandarinus is a medium-to-large sized species of siphon whelk. The length of the holotype is 96 mm, its diameter 40 mm.

(Original description in Latin and French) The shell is ovate-fusiform in shape, somewhat swollen, and very finely transversely striated, with a dark brown coloration. The whorls are strongly convex. The siphonal canal is shorter than the spire. The aperture is elongated, and the inner side of the lip is grooved.

The shell is ovate and fusiform in shape, slightly swollen and fairly thick, and it is finely and uniformly striated, with a brown color tinged with red. The spire is composed of eight whorls, the first of which show a slight nodular appearance. The aperture is white, and the outer lip is strongly striated on the inside.

The species could be confused with the sympatric species P. maximus, however P. mandarinus is typically smaller and has a smoother shell with a shorter siphonal canal.

Example shells
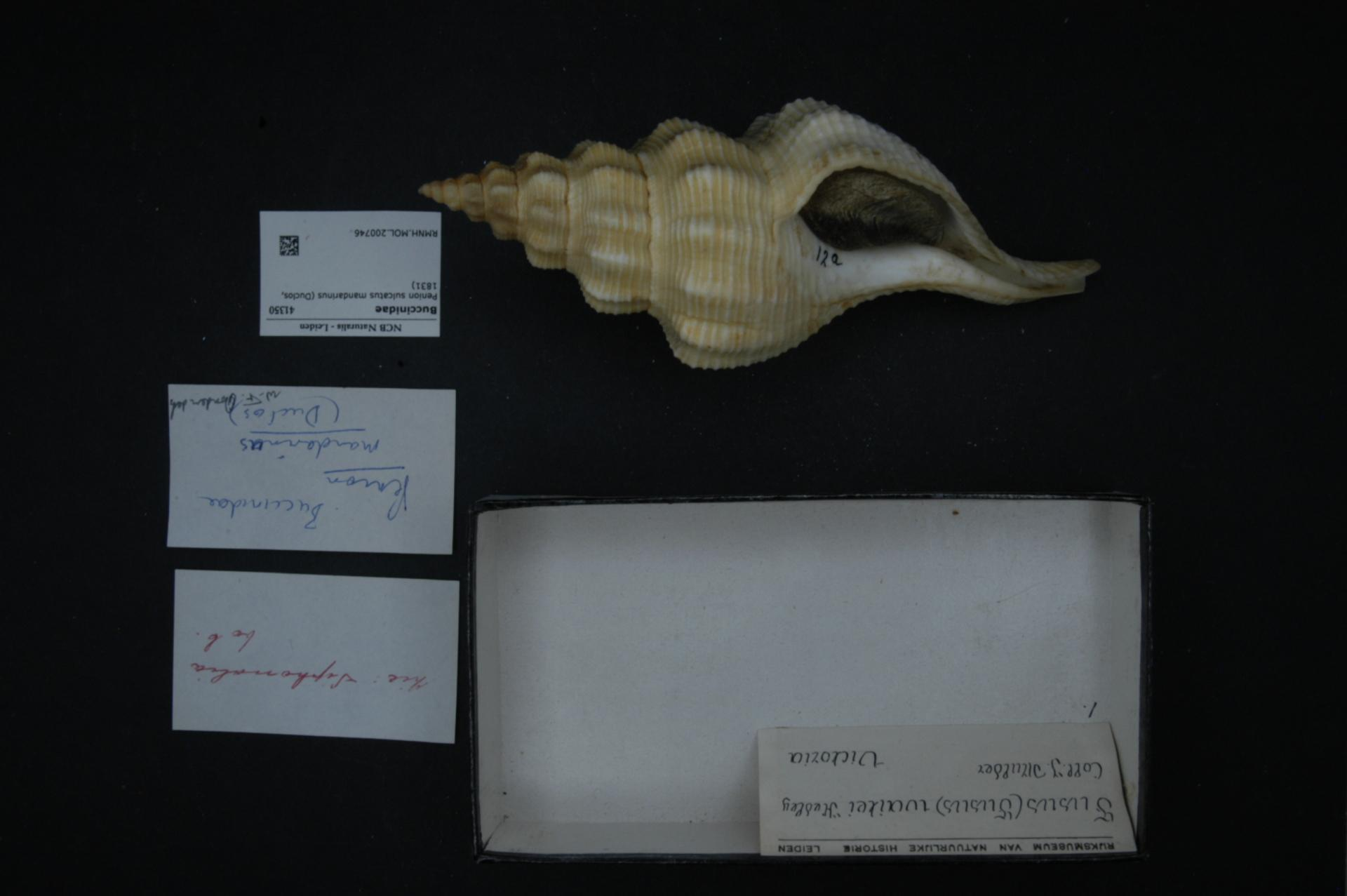

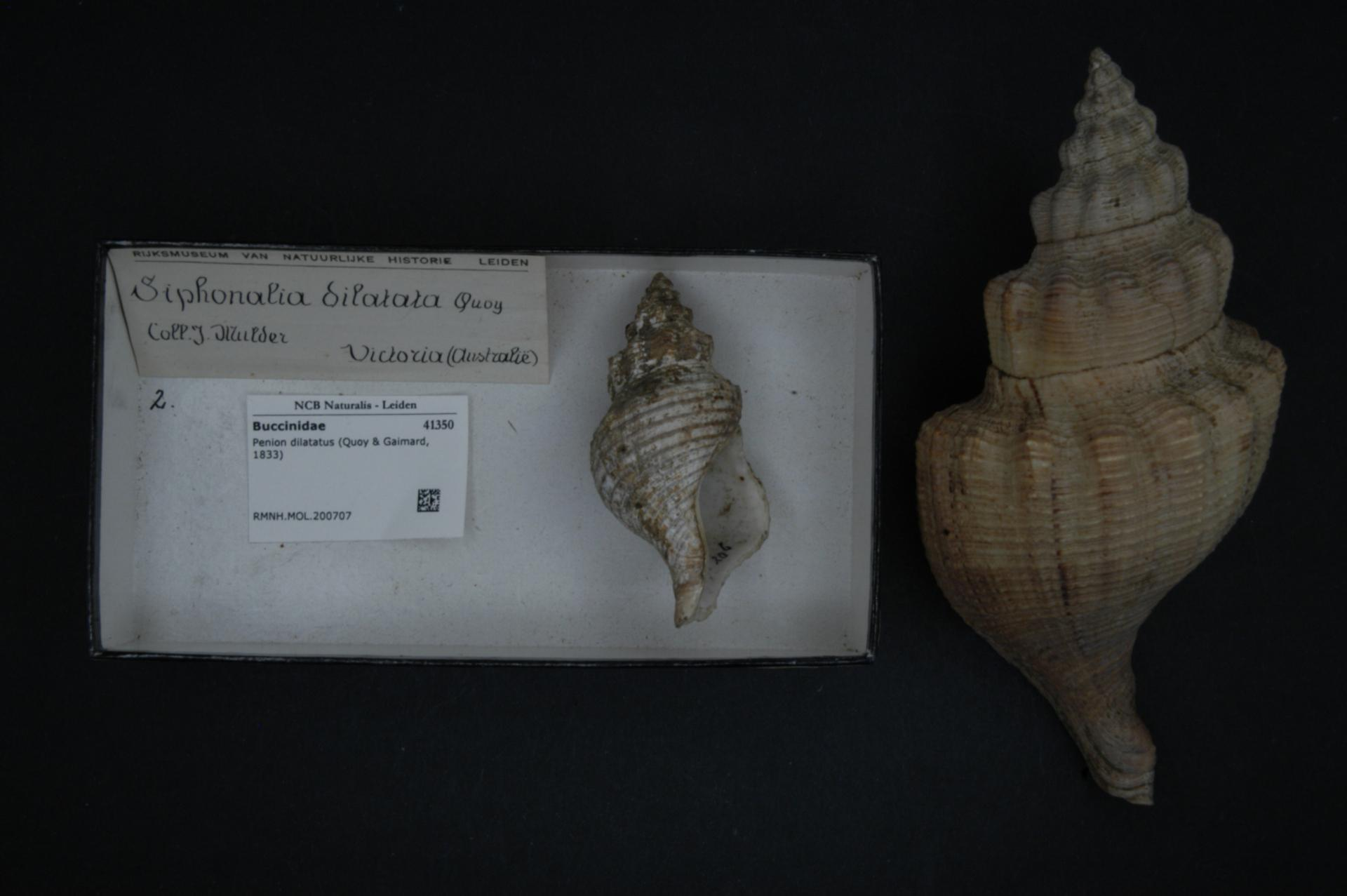

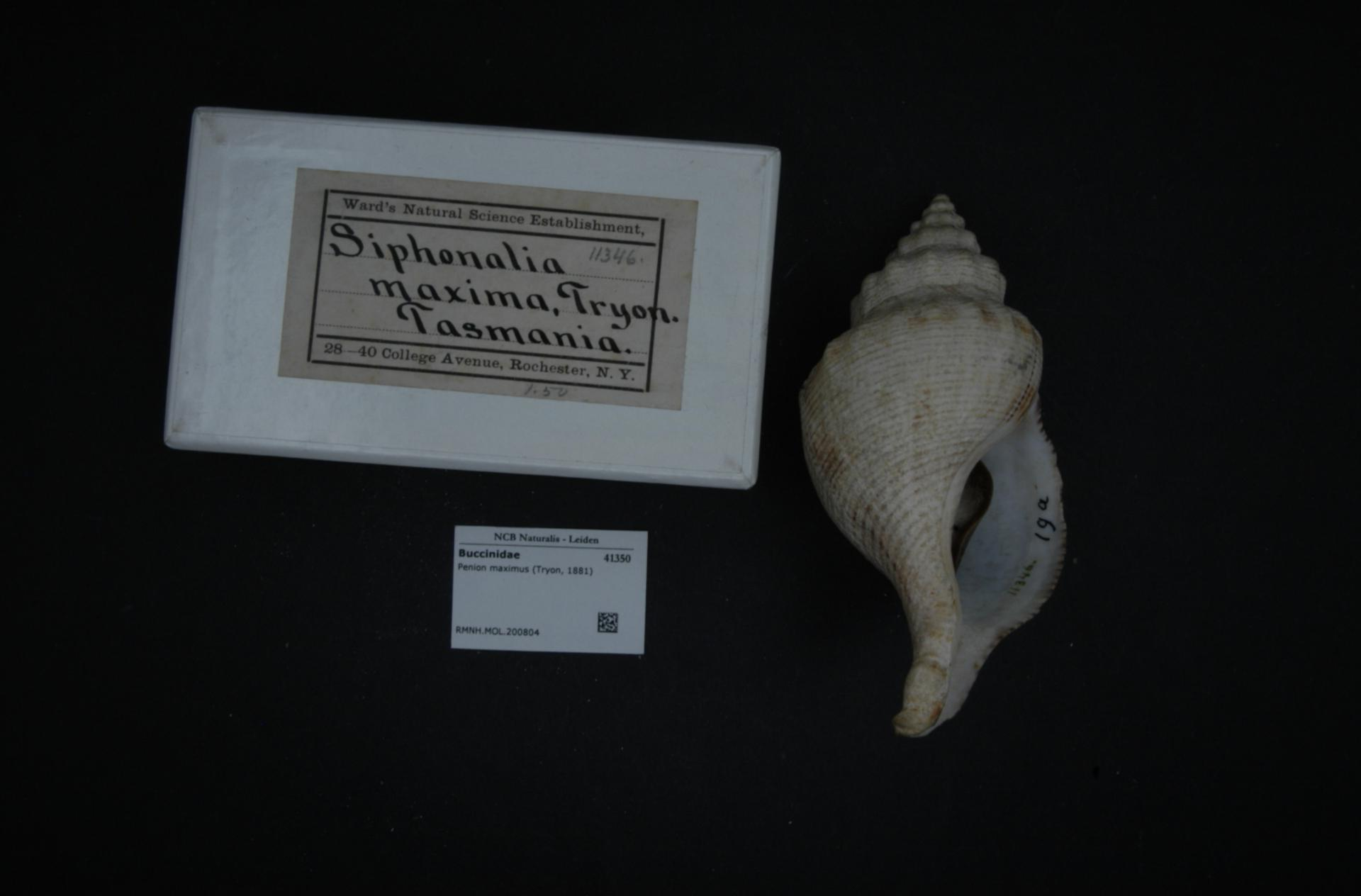

== Distribution ==
This marine species is endemic to Australia (New South Wales, South Australia, Tasmania, Victoria).

== Evolution ==
Penion mandarinus is closely related to another Australian species P. maximus. The species have overlapping geographic ranges (sympatry) and may have evolved from a common ancestor via niche differentiation based on prey size and water depth.

== Subspecies ==
These subspecies have been previously recognised:

- Penion mandarinus mandarinus (Duclos, P.L., 1831)
- Penion mandarinus waitei (Hedley, 1903)
