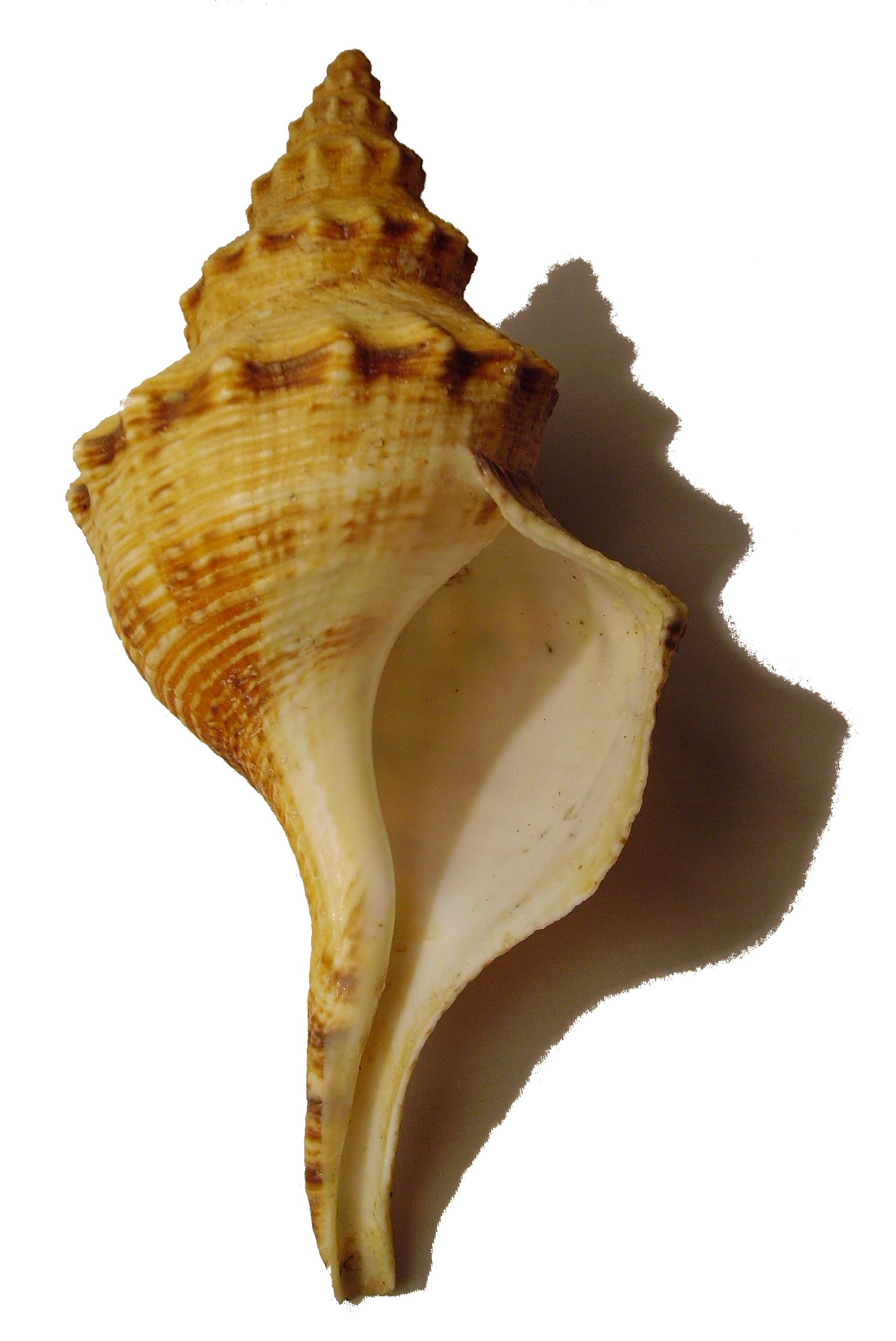
- A shell of Penion maximus

Scientific classification
- Kingdom: Animalia
- Phylum: Mollusca
- Class: Gastropoda
- Subclass: Caenogastropoda
- Order: Neogastropoda
- Family: Austrosiphonidae
- Genus: Penion
- Species: P. maximus

Binomial name
- Penion maximus (Tryon, G.W., 1881)

Synonyms
- Siphonalia maxima Tryon, 1881 (superseded combination)

= Penion maximus =

Species of gastropod

Penion maximus is a species of very large predatory sea snail or whelk, commonly known as giant whelk or great whelk, a marine gastropod mollusc in the family Austrosiphonidae.

== Description ==
Penion maximus is the largest species in this genus, measuring 190.5 mm in length. The species could be confused with the sympatric species P. mandarinus, however P. mandarinus is typically smaller and has a smoother shell with a shorter siphonal canal. Their shells are highly coveted due to the intricate designs embedded in onto the shells.

(Original description) The white shell is sprinkled and blotched with light chestnut-brown across the spiral ribs. A broad brown band is positioned between the tubercles on the shoulder of the whorls, while the aperture remains a pure white.

== Distribution ==
The range of the species extends from waters off Tasmania and Victoria to lower Queensland.

== Evolution ==
Penion maximus is closely related to another Australian species P. mandarinus. The species have overlapping geographic ranges (sympatry) and may have evolved from a common ancestor via niche differentiation based on prey size and water depth.
