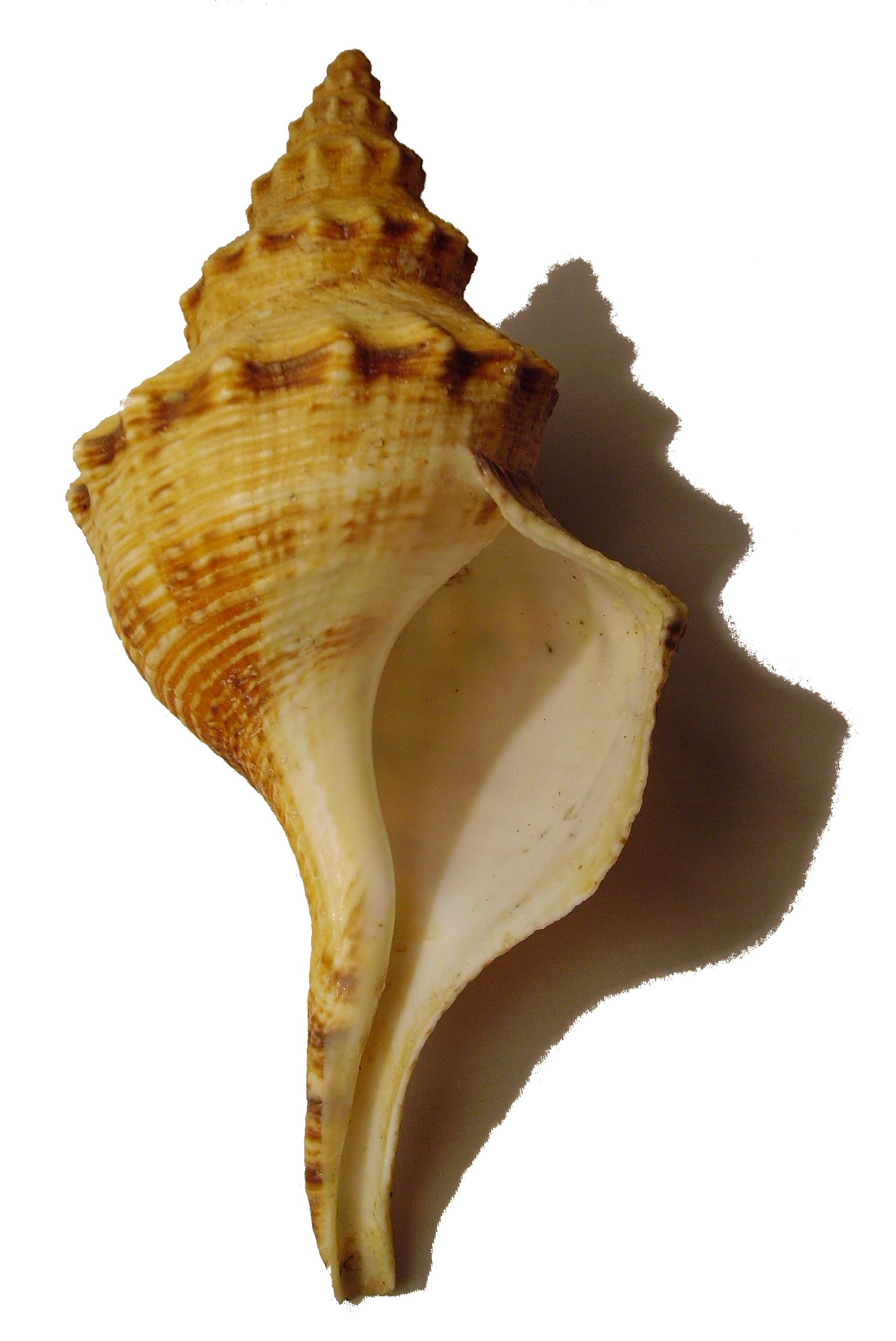
- A shell of Penion maximus

Scientific classification
- Kingdom: Animalia
- Phylum: Mollusca
- Class: Gastropoda
- Subclass: Caenogastropoda
- Order: Neogastropoda
- Superfamily: Buccinoidea; Rafinesque, 1815

Families
- See text

= Buccinoidea =

Superfamily of molluscs

Buccinoidea is a taxonomic superfamily of very small to large predatory sea snails, marine gastropod mollusks.

This superfamily is in the clade Neogastropoda according to the taxonomy of the Gastropoda (Bouchet & Rocroi, 2005). It had been placed within the infraorder Neogastropoda according to the taxonomy of the Gastropoda (Ponder & Lindberg, 1997).

== Families ==
These families are within Buccinoidea in the taxonomy of the Gastropoda by Bouchet & Rocroi (2005):

- Austrosiphonidae Cotton & Godfrey, 1938
- Belomitridae Kantor, Puillandre, Rivasseau & Bouchet, 2012
- Buccinanopsidae Galindo, Puillandre, Lozouet & Bouchet, 2016
- Buccinidae Rafinesque, 1815
- Busyconidae Wade, 1917 (1867)
- Chauvetiidae Kantor, Fedosov, Kosyan, Puillandre, Sorokin, Kano, R. Clark & Bouchet, 2022
- Colubrariidae Dall, 1904
- Columbellidae Swainson, 1840
- Cominellidae Gray, 1857
- Cyllenidae Bellardi, 1882
- Dolicholatiridae Kantor, Fedosov, Kosyan, Puillandre, Sorokin, Kano, R. Clark & Bouchet, 2022
- † Echinofulguridae Petuch, 1994
- Eosiphonidae Kantor, Fedosov, Kosyan, Puillandre, Sorokin, Kano, R. Clark & Bouchet, 2022
- Fasciolariidae Gray, 1853
- Liomesidae P. Fischer, 1884
- Melongenidae Gill, 1871 (1854)
- Nassariidae Iredale, 1916 (1835)
- Pisaniidae Gray, 1857
- Prodotiidae Kantor, Fedosov, Kosyan, Puillandre, Sorokin, Kano, R. Clark & Bouchet, 2022
- Prosiphonidae Powell, 1951
- Retimohniidae Kantor, Fedosov, Kosyan, Puillandre, Sorokin, Kano, R. Clark & Bouchet, 2022
- Tudiclidae Cossmann, 1901
- Some genera are treated as unassigned within the superfamily Buccinoidea: Buccinoidea incertae sedis (temporary name)
- Afrocominella Iredale, 1918
- Aidemofusus Kosyan & Kantor, 2013
- Angistoma F. Sandberger, 1861 †
- Aquilofusus Kautsky, 1925 †
- Atkinsonella H. J. Finlay, 1930 †
- Austrocominella Ihering, 1907 †
- Austrosphaera Furque & Camacho, 1949 †
- Bartonia Cossmann, 1901 †
- Belophos Cossmann, 1901 †
- Buccipagoda Ponder, 2010
- Burnupena Iredale, 1918
- Chickcharnea Petuch, 2002
- Coptochetus Cossmann, 1889 †
- Cyrtochetus Cossmann, 1889 †
- Daphnobela Cossmann, 1896 †
- Egotistica Marwick, 1934 †
- Eosiphonalia Ruth, 1942 †
- Euryochetus Cossmann, 1896 †
- Euthrenopsis A. W. B. Powell, 1929
- Fascinus Hedley, 1903
- Fax Iredale, 1925
- Glypteuthria Strebel, 1905
- Godfreyena Iredale, 1934
- Iosepha Tenison Woods, 1879
- Jerrybuccinum Kantor & Pastorino, 2009
- Kergipenion Fletcher, 1938 †
- Loochooia MacNeil, 1961 †
- Lyrofusus De Gregorio, 1880 †
- Macron H. Adams & A. Adams, 1853
- Microdeuthria Pastorino, 2016
- Nassicola H. J. Finlay, 1924 †
- Nicema Woodring, 1964
- Odontobasis Meek, 1876 †
- Oligonalia Lozouet, 2021 †
- Ornopsis Wade, 1916 †
- Pangoa Marwick, 1931 †
- Paracominia A. W. B. Powell & Bartrum, 1929 †
- Parvisipho Cossmann, 1889 †
- Pomahakia Finlay, 1927 †
- Pseudofax H. J. Finlay & Marwick, 1937 †
- Pseudoneptunea Kobelt, 1882
- Pseudotylostoma Ihering, 1903 †
- Pseudovaricia Tate, 1888 †
- Ptychosalpinx Gill, 1867
- Ruscula T. L. Casey, 1904 †
- Sagenotriton B. A. Marshall & Walton, 2019
- Searlesia Harmer, 1914 †
- Sulcosinus Dall, 1891
- Suessionia Cossmann, 1889 †
- Tortisipho Cossmann, 1889 †
- Varicosipho Cossmann, 1901 †
- Wrigleya Glibert, 1963 †
- Zelandiella H. J. Finlay, 1926 †

== Synonyms ==
- Alectrionidae Dall, 1908: synonym of Nassariinae Iredale, 1916 (1835)
- Anachidae Golikov & Starobogatov, 1972: synonym of Columbellidae Swainson, 1840
- Buccinulidae Finlay, 1928: synonym of Buccinulini Finlay, 1928
- Cominellidae: synonym of Buccinidae Rafinesque, 1815
- Nassidae Swainson, 1835: synonym of Nassariidae Iredale, 1916 (1835)
- Neptuneidae Stimpson, 1865: synonym of Buccinidae Rafinesque, 1815
- Peristerniidae Tryon, 1880: synonym of Peristerniinae Tryon, 1880
- Pyrenidae Suter, 1909: synonym of Columbellidae Swainson, 1840
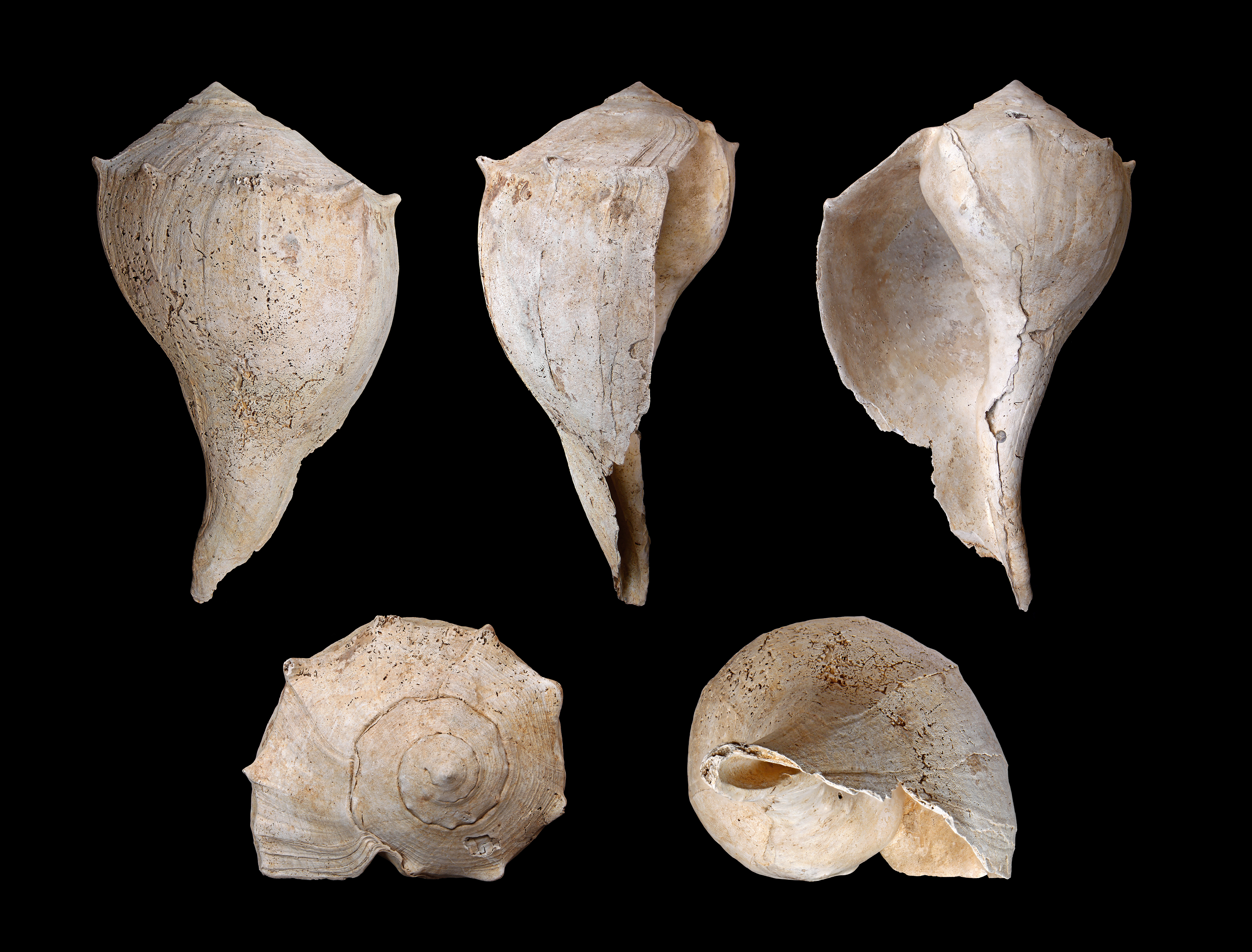
Busycon contrarium, a Busyconidae

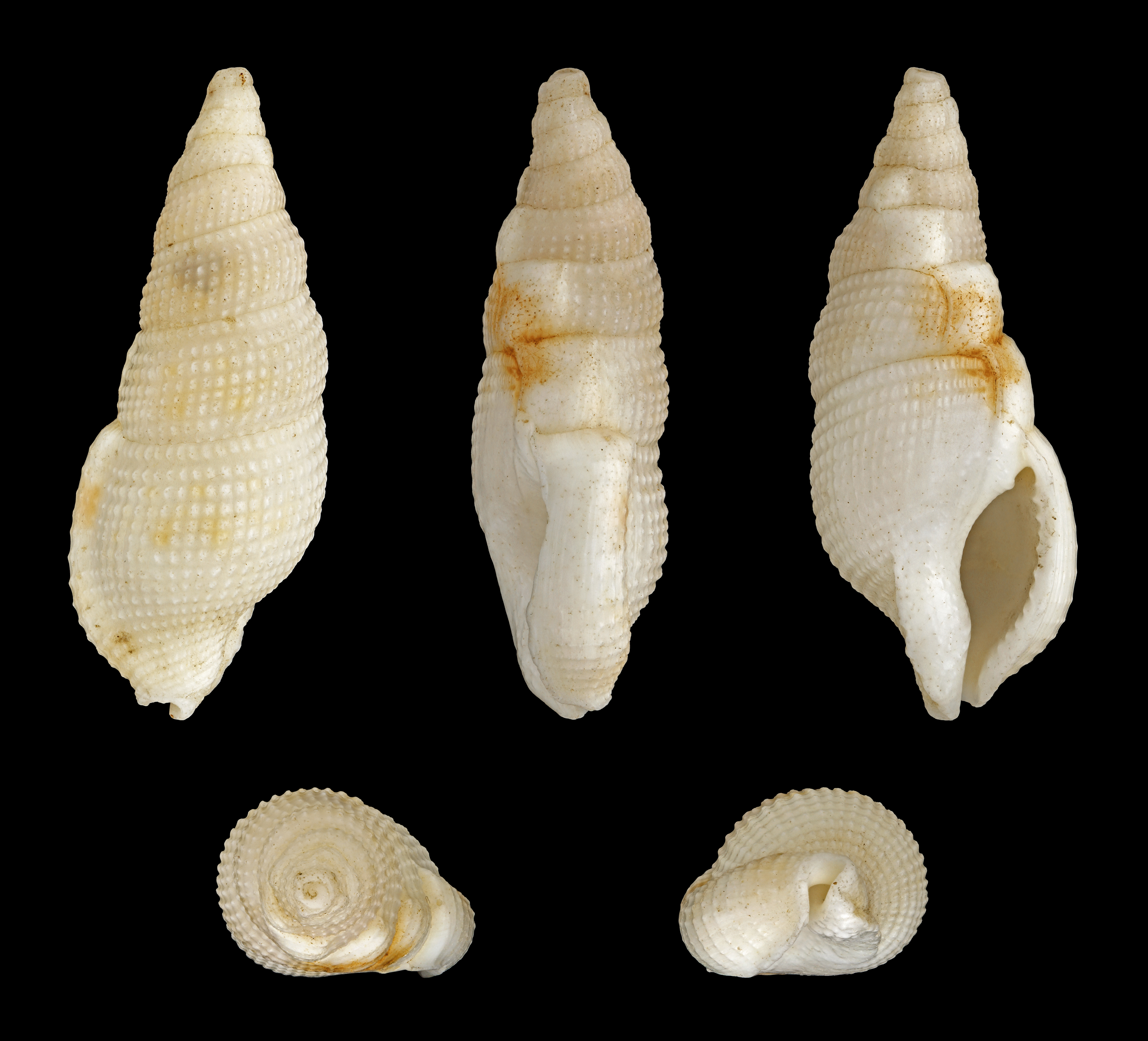
Colubraria tortuosa, a Colubrariidae

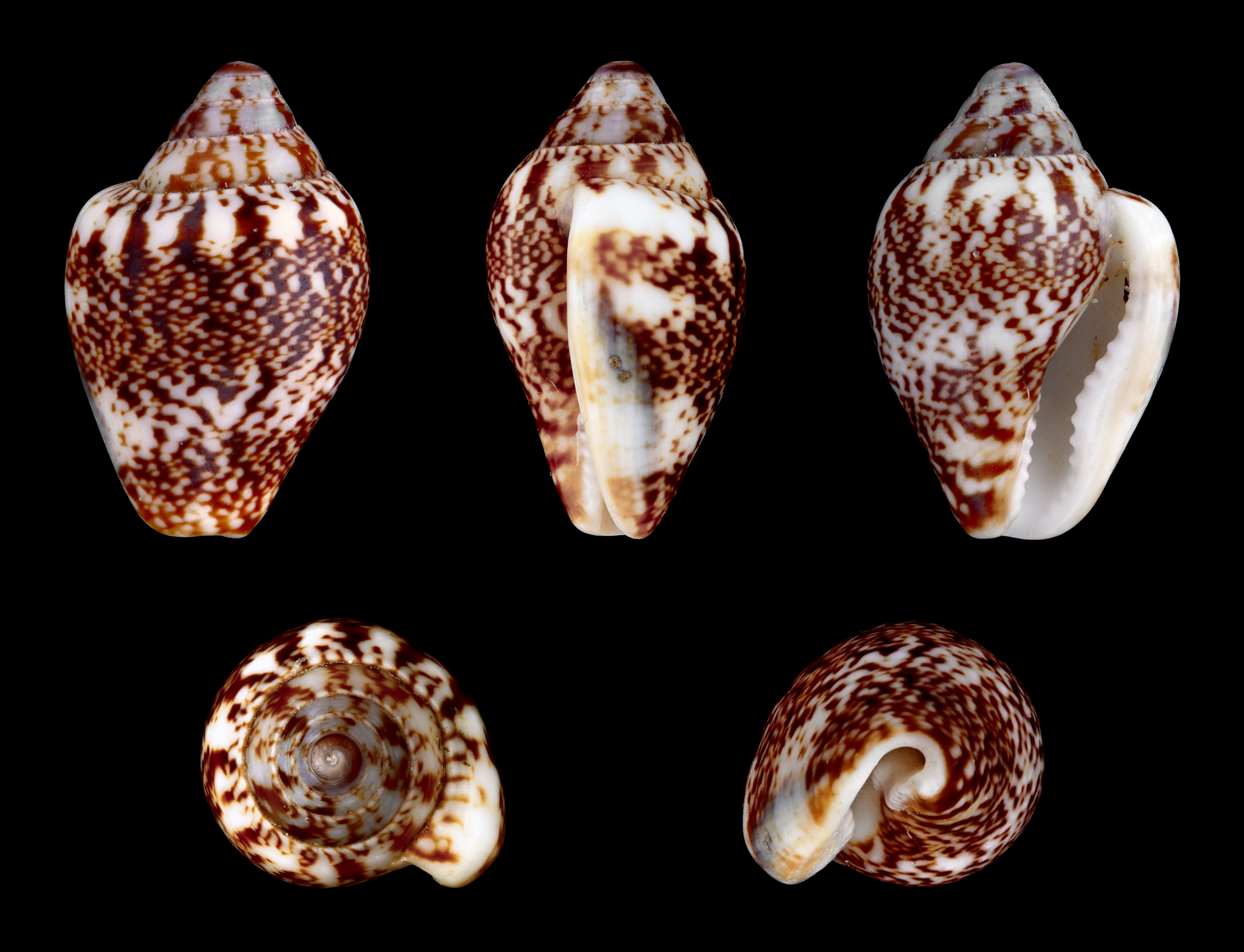
Columbella rustica, a Columbellidae

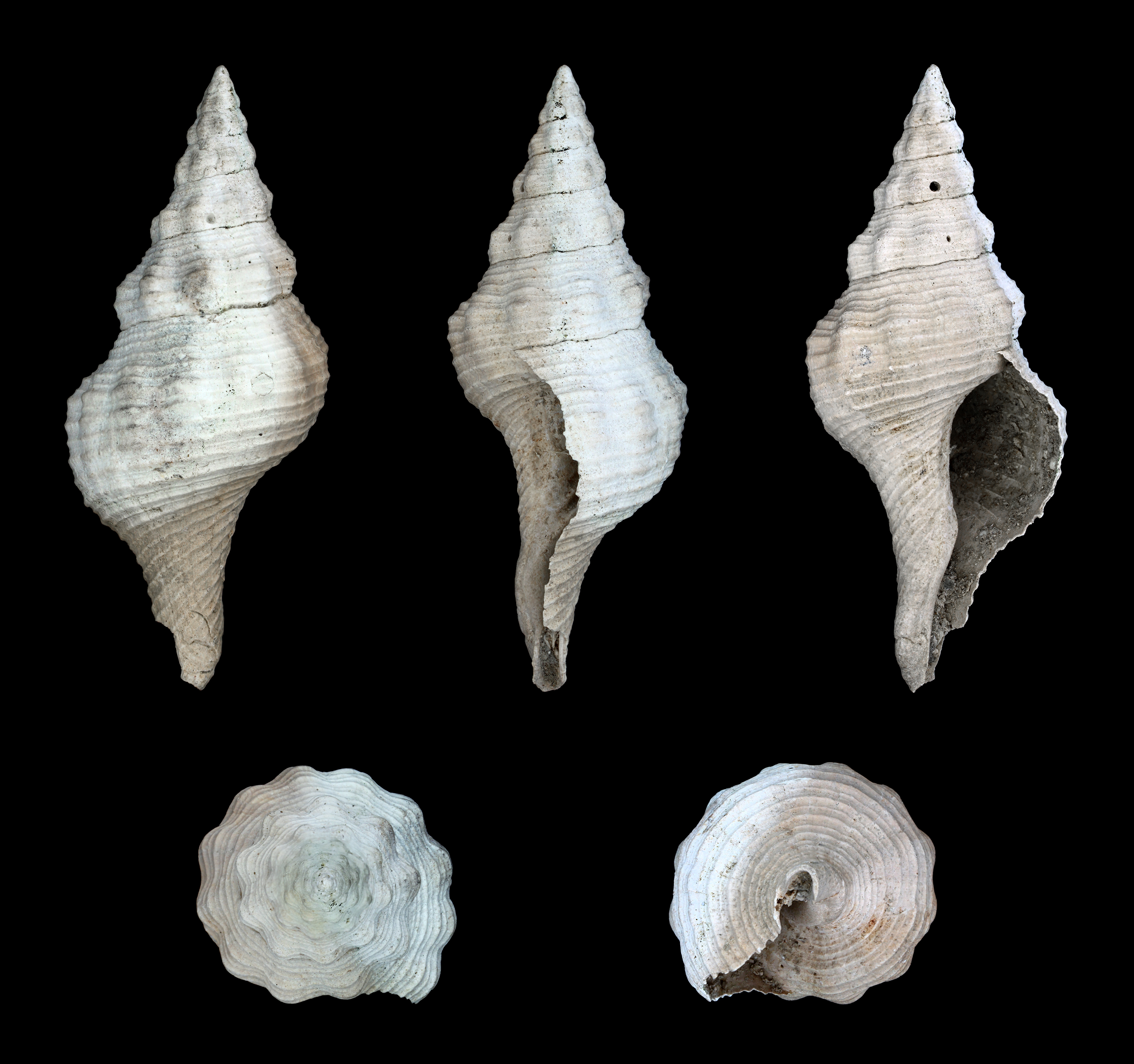
Fasciolaria scalarina, a Fasciolariidae

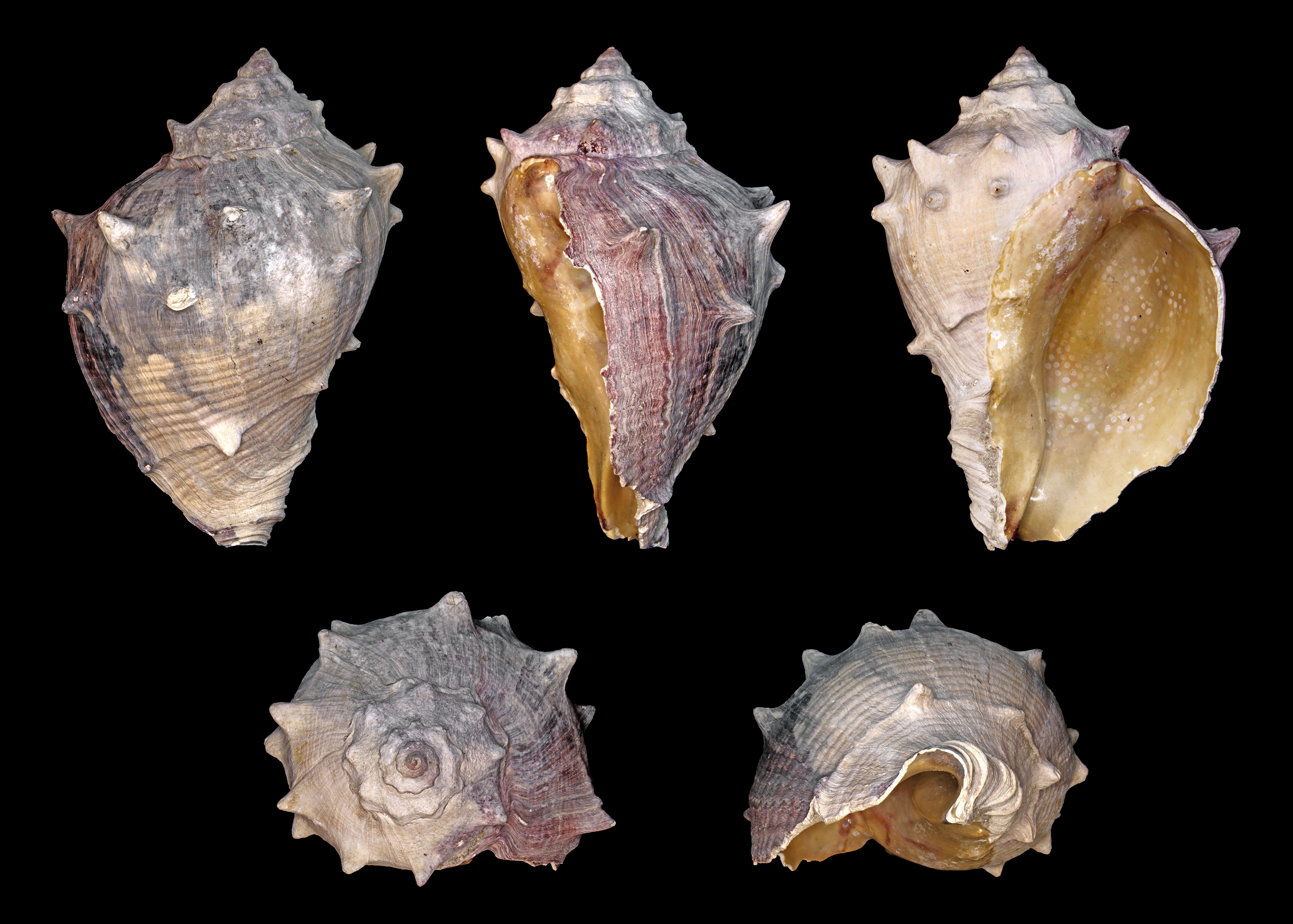
Melongena consors, a Melongenidae

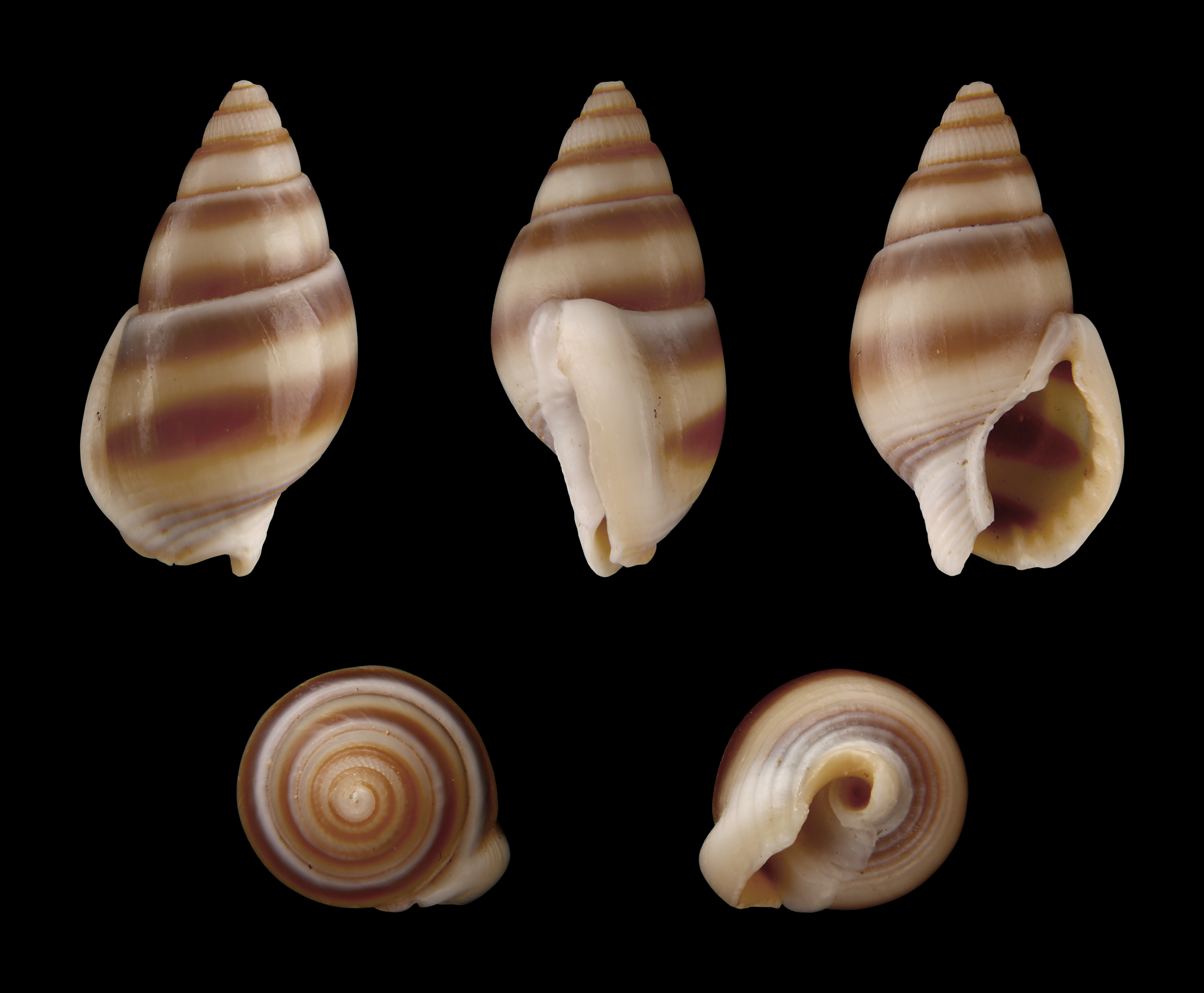
Nassarius reeveanus, a Nassariidae

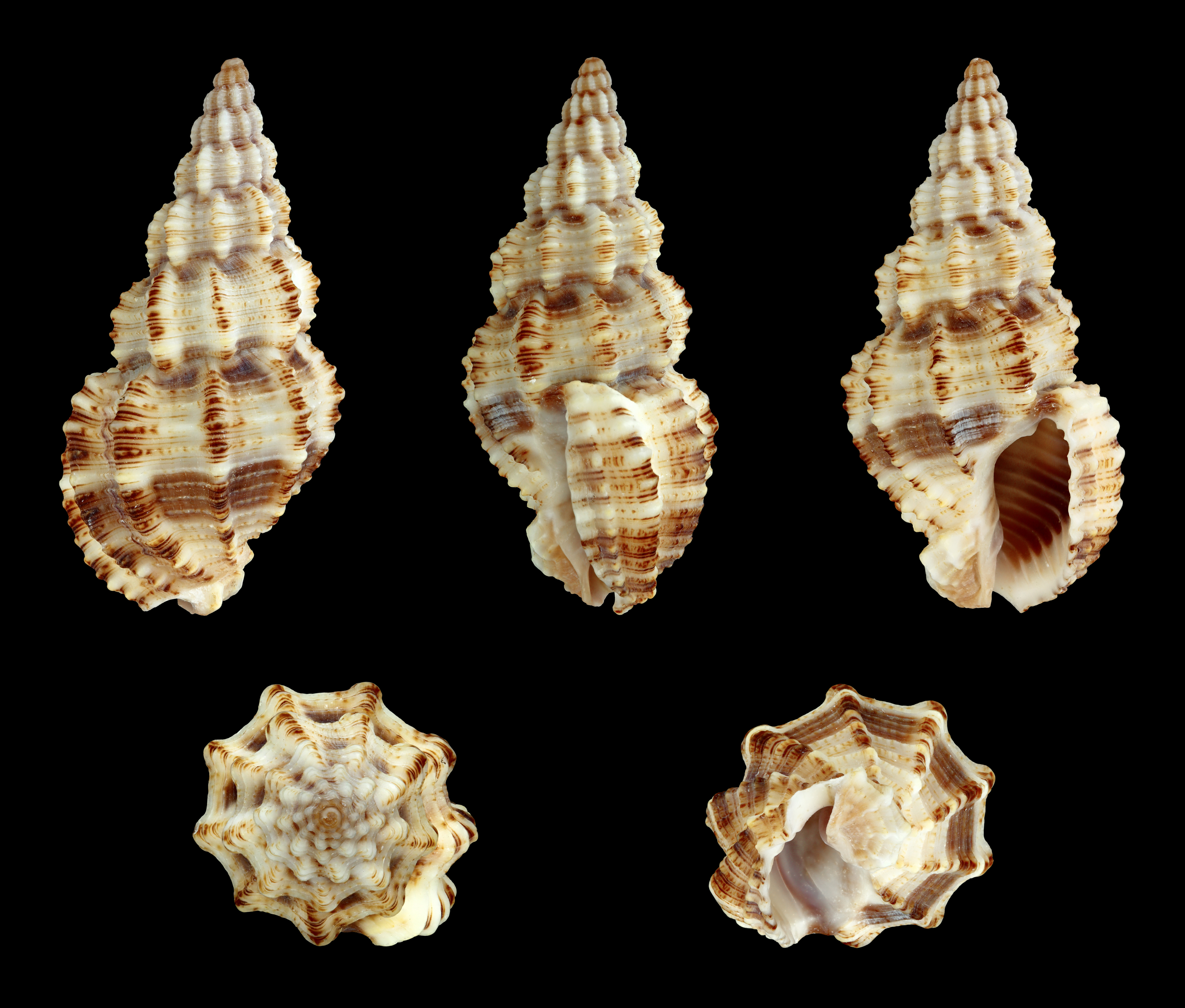
Phos senticosus, a Nassariidae
