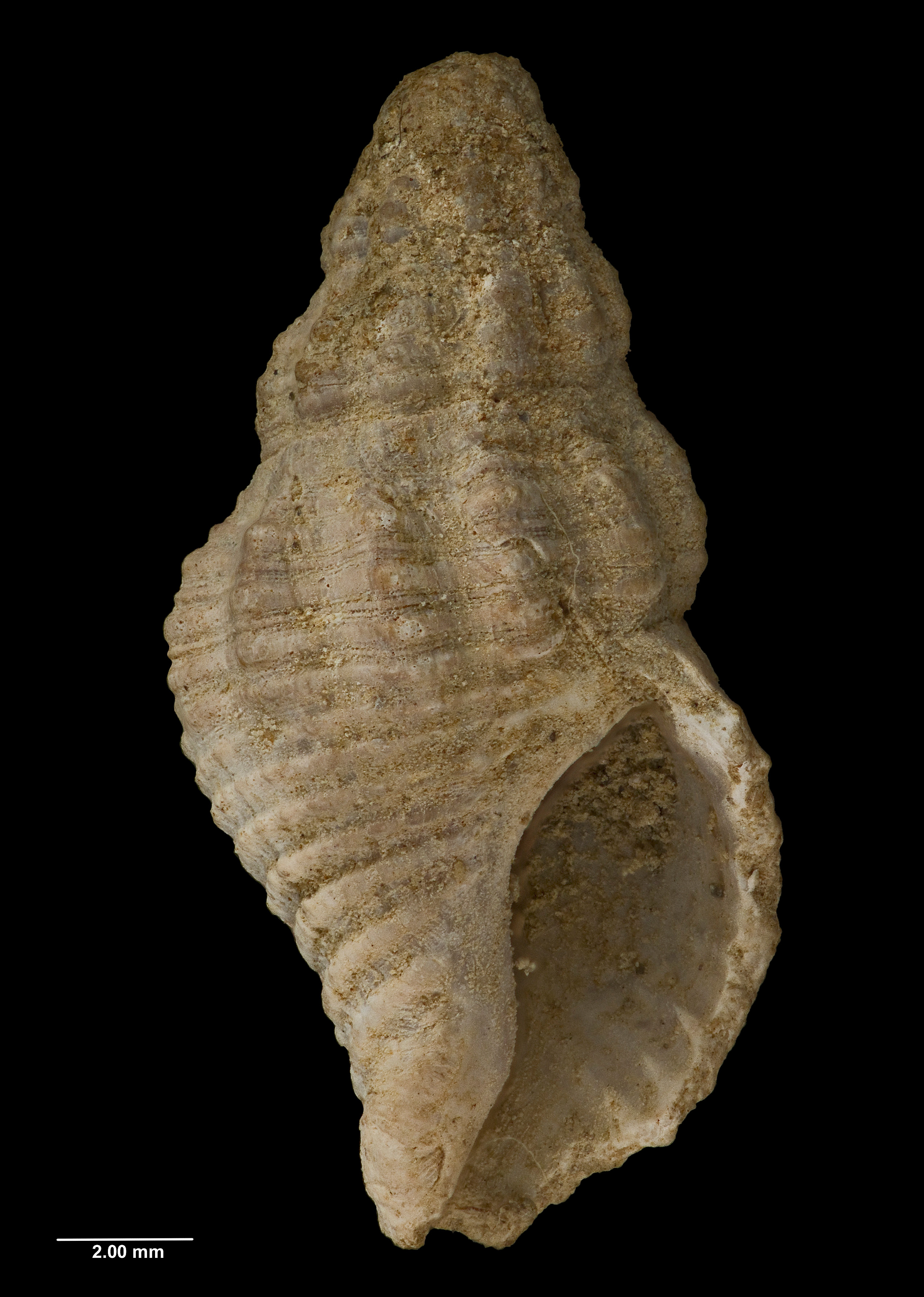
- Holotype from Auckland War Memorial Museum

Scientific classification
- Kingdom: Animalia
- Phylum: Mollusca
- Class: Gastropoda
- Subclass: Caenogastropoda
- Order: Neogastropoda
- Family: Tudiclidae
- Genus: Buccinulum
- Species: †B. wairarapaense

Binomial name
- †Buccinulum wairarapaense A. W. B. Powell, 1938

Synonyms
- Buccinulum (Euthrena) wairarapaensis A. W. B. Powell, 1938; Buccinulum wairarapaensis A. W. B. Powell, 1938

= Buccinulum wairarapaense =

Buccinulum wairarapaense Temporal range: 2.40 Ma

Extinct species of gastropod

Buccinulum wairarapaense is an extinct species of marine mollusc gastropod in the family Tudiclidae. Fossils of the species date to the Pleistocene in New Zealand, and the species likely lived in deep waters.

== Description ==
In the original description, Powell described the species as follows:

Shell of moderate size, solid, prominently spirally ridged and axially costate. Number of whorls probably five (apex eroded). Spire a little taller than height of aperture plus canal. Outline of spire convex, but with a concave shoulder occupying the upper third of the whorls. Spiral sculpture of six rounded cords on spire whorls, two of which are on the shoulder; each with an interstitial thread. Thirteen spirals on the body whorl, becoming stronger over the base, the interstial thread being augmented by still finer spiral lirae. Fasciole rounded, devoid of spiral ribbing and not marked off from the base by a ridge. Axials regular, fold-like, not extending over the base; twelve on the penultimate whorl. Outer lip broken. Inner lip with a weak denticle on the parietal callus near to the posterior notch. Aperture spirally lirate within.

The holotype of the species has an estimated height of 19 mm (0.75 in) and a diameter of 9 mm (0.35 in). It can be differentiated from B. colensoi due to its stronger axial sculpture, spiral sculpture and concave shoulder, and from B. pertinax finlayi due to its more prominent sculpture.

== Ecology ==
The species likely lived on the outer shelf or deep waters.

== Taxonomy ==
The species was first described by A.W.B. Powell in 1938, who used the name Buccinulum (Euthrena) wairarapaensis. While Buccinulum wairarapaensis has been used as the accepted name in New Zealand texts, the World Register of Marine Species uses the spelling Buccinulum wairarapaense. Closely related to B. colensoi, Winston Ponder considered two possibilities for the species: that it represents a population separate from B. colensoi that lived on the east coast of the North Island and eastern Cook Strait that became extinct, or that B. colensoi is a hybrid species produced by the interbreeding of B. wairarapaense with B. vittatum.

The holotype was collected in either 1924 or 1927 by A. W. B. Powell, from lighthouse reef, Castlepoint, Wairarapa, New Zealand, and is held by the Auckland War Memorial Museum.

== Distribution ==
This extinct marine species occurs in Pleistocene (Nukumaruan stage) of New Zealand, dating to 2.40 million years before the present, including the Castlepoint Formation and the Haumuri Bluff of the southern Kaikōura District.
