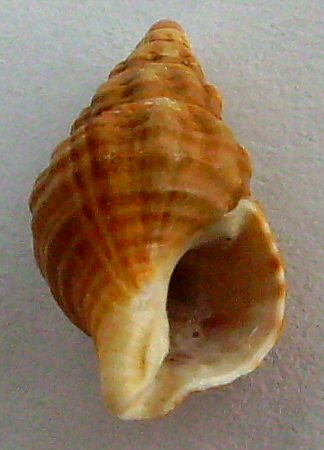
- Apertural view of a shell of Buccinulum vittatum vittatum

Scientific classification
- Kingdom: Animalia
- Phylum: Mollusca
- Class: Gastropoda
- Subclass: Caenogastropoda
- Order: Neogastropoda
- Superfamily: Buccinoidea
- Family: Tudiclidae
- Genus: Buccinulum; Deshayes, 1830

Type species
- Murex lineatus Gmelin, 1791

Synonyms
- Buccinulum (Chathamina) Finlay, 1928; Buccinulum (Euthrena) Iredale, 1918; Buccinulum (Evarnula) Finlay, 1926; Euthrena Iredale, 1918; Evarne H. Adams & A. Adams, 1853; Evarnula Finlay, 1926 †

= Buccinulum =

Buccinulum Temporal range: Late Oligocene to Recent, 25.2–0.0 Ma

Genus of gastropods

Buccinulum is a genus of sea snails, marine gastropod molluscs in the whelk family Tudiclidae.

== Description ==
Buccinulum are small to medium-sized marine snails. Species vary significantly in shell sculpture and colouration and can be difficult to distinguish from one another.

== Distribution ==
The majority of extant and fossil species are from New Zealand. Most species are commonly abundant within the intertidal and shallow subtidal zone of New Zealand beaches.

== Evolution ==
Buccinulum is closely related to the genus Aeneator.

Cladogram of Austrosiphonidae and Tudiclidae

- - - Antarctoneptunea
    - Kelletia
    - Penion
    - Serratifusus
- - Aeneator
  - Buccinulum
  - Euthria
  - Tasmeuthria

== Species ==
Species within the genus Buccinulum include:

- Buccinulum bountyensis (Powell, 1929)
- Buccinulum brunobrianoi (Parth, 1993)
- Buccinulum colensoi (Suter, 1908)
- † Buccinulum caudatum (Powell, 1929)
- † Buccinulum compactum compactum (Suter, 1917)
  - † Buccinulum compactum tetleyi (Powell & Batrum, 1929)
- Buccinulum flexicostatum Dell, 1956
- Buccinulum fuscozonatum (Suter, 1908)
- † Buccinulum grindleyi (Marwick, 1965)
- Buccinulum linea linea (Martyn, 1784)
  - Buccinulum linea flexicostatum (Dell, 1956)
- Buccinulum lineare (Reeve, 1846)
- Buccinulum littorinoides (Reeve, 1846)
- † Buccinulum longicolle (Powell, 1929)
- Buccinulum mariae (Powell, 1940)
- † Buccinulum medium (Hutton, 1885)
- Buccinulum otagoensis (Powell, 1929)
- Buccinulum pallidum pallidum (Finlay, 1928)
  - Buccinulum pallidum powelli (Ponder, 1971)
- † Buccinulum pangoides (Beu, 1973)
- Buccinulum pertinax pertinax (von Martens, 1878)
  - Buccinulum pertinax finlayi (Powell, 1929)
  - † Buccinulum pertinax pansum (Finlay, 1965)
- Buccinulum ponsonbyi (G. B. Sowerby III, 1889)
- † Buccinulum protensum (Powell, 1929)
- Buccinulum queketti (E. A. Smith, 1901)
- † Buccinulum rigidum (Powell, 1929)
- Buccinulum robustum (Powell, 1929)
- † Buccinulum tuberculatum (Powell, 1929)
- Buccinulum turrita (Tenison-Woods, 1875)
- Buccinulum venusta (Powell, 1929)
- Buccinulum vittatum vittatum (Quoy & Gaimard, 1833)
  - Buccinulum vittatum bicinctum (Hutton, 1873)
  - Buccinulum vittatum littorinoides (Reeve, 1846)
  - † Buccinulum vittatum tepikiensis (Powell, 1929)
- † Buccinulum wairarapaense (Powell, 1938)

Species brought into synonymy

- † Buccinulum caelatum Powell, 1929: synonym of Buccinulum linea (Martyn, 1784)
- Buccinulum clarckei (Tenison Woods, 1875): synonym of Tasmeuthria clarkei (Tenison Woods, 1876)
- Buccinulum corneum (Linnaeus, 1758): synonym of Euthria cornea (Linnaeus, 1758)
- † Buccinulum ectypum Marwick, 1931: synonym of † Gemmocolus ectypa (Marwick, 1931) (original combination)
- Buccinulum finlayi Powell, 1929: synonym of Buccinulum pertinax finlayi Powell, 1929 (original combination)
- Buccinulum heteromorphum Powell, 1929: synonym of Buccinulum vittatum (Quoy & Gaimard, 1833)
- Buccinulum kaikouraense Powell, 1929: synonym of Buccinulum littorinoides (Reeve, 1846)
- Buccinulum maketuense Powell, 1929: synonym of Buccinulum vittatum (Quoy & Gaimard, 1833)
- Buccinulum marwicki Finlay, 1928: synonym of Buccinulum pertinax (E. von Martens, 1878)
- Buccinulum marwicki marwicki Finlay, 1928: synonym of Buccinulum pertinax (E. von Martens, 1878)
- Buccinulum motutaraense Powell, 1929: synonym of Buccinulum vittatum (Quoy & Gaimard, 1833)
- Buccinulum multilineum Powell, 1929: synonym of Buccinulum linea (Martyn, 1784)
- Buccinulum mutabile Powell, 1929: synonym of Buccinulum pertinax (E. von Martens, 1878)
- † Buccinulum pangoides Beu, 1973 : synonym of † Euthria pangoides (Beu, 1973)
- † Buccinulum scottae Marwick, 1965 : synonym of † Taron scottae (Marwick, 1965) (original combination)
- Buccinulum squalidum Powell, 1929: synonym of Buccinulum linea (Martyn, 1784)
- Buccinulum strebeli (Suter, 1908): synonym of Buccinulum vittatum littorinoides (Reeve, 1846): synonym of Buccinulum littorinoides (Reeve, 1846)
- Buccinulum strebeli strebeli (Suter, 1908): synonym of Buccinulum littorinoides (Reeve, 1846)
- Buccinulum sufflatum Finlay, 1926: synonym of Buccinulum linea (Martyn, 1784)
- Buccinulum tenuistriatum Powell, 1929: synonym of Buccinulum pallidum Finlay, 1928
- Buccinulum waitangiensis Powell, 1933: synonym of Buccinulum linea (Martyn, 1784)
