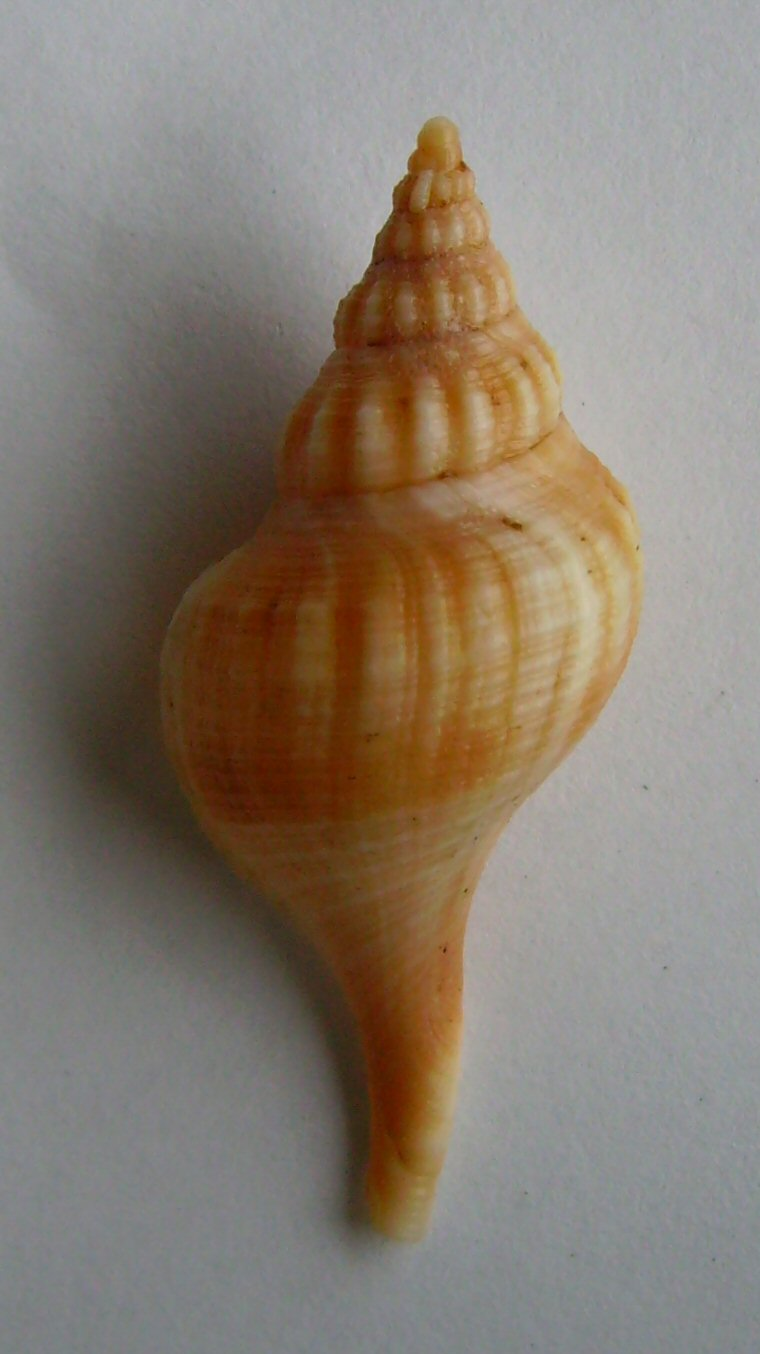
- A shell of Aeneator marshalli separabilis

Scientific classification
- Kingdom: Animalia
- Phylum: Mollusca
- Class: Gastropoda
- Subclass: Caenogastropoda
- Order: Neogastropoda
- Family: Tudiclidae
- Genus: Aeneator
- Species: A. marshalli
- Subspecies: A. m. separabilis

Trinomial name
- Aeneator marshalli separabilis Dell, 1956

= Aeneator marshalli separabilis =

Subspecies of gastropod

Aeneator marshalli separabilis is a subspecies of large sea snail, a whelk, a marine gastropod mollusc in the family Tudiclidae.

== Description ==
The length of the shell attains 53 mm, its diameter is 24 mm.

== Distribution ==
This subspecies is endemic to New Zealand and occurs off North Island, Bay of Plenty.
