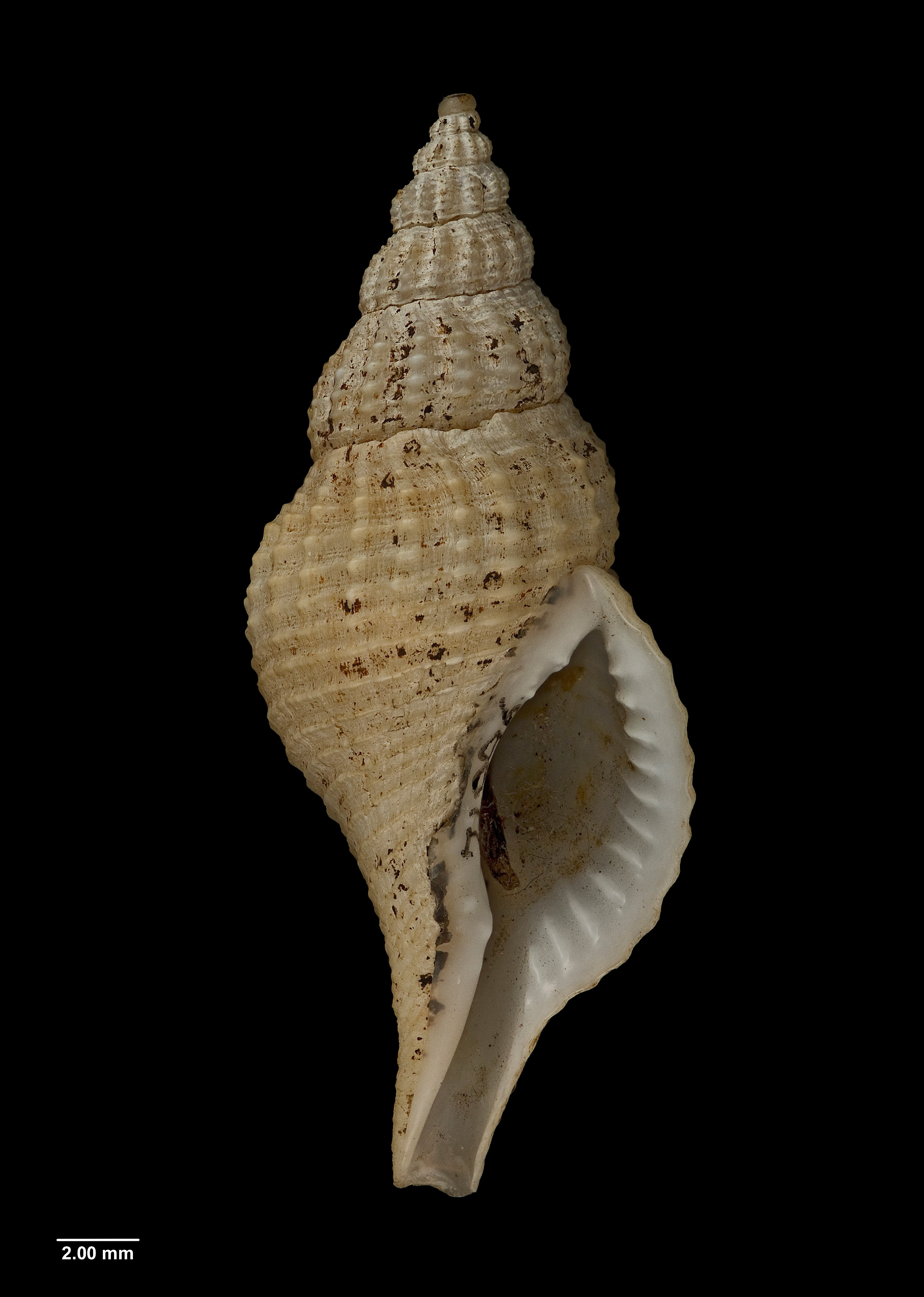
- Shell of Aeneator galatheae (specimen at the Auckland War Memorial Museum)

Scientific classification
- Kingdom: Animalia
- Phylum: Mollusca
- Class: Gastropoda
- Subclass: Caenogastropoda
- Order: Neogastropoda
- Family: Tudiclidae
- Genus: Aeneator
- Species: A. galatheae

Binomial name
- Aeneator galatheae Powell, 1958)

= Aeneator galatheae =

Species of gastropod

Aeneator galatheae is a species of sea snail, a whelk, a marine gastropod mollusc in the family Tudiclidae.
