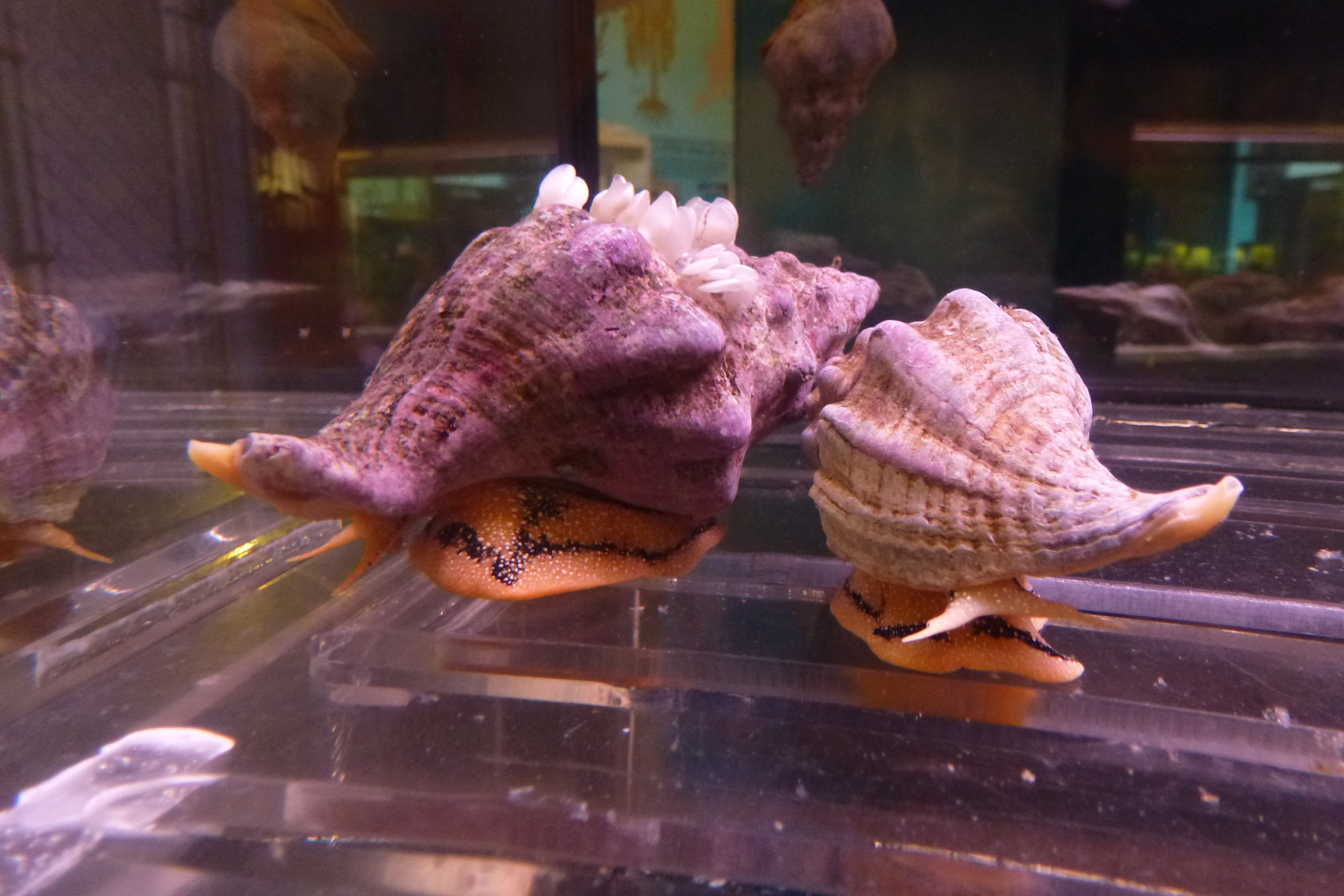
- Two live Kelletia kelletii

Scientific classification
- Kingdom: Animalia
- Phylum: Mollusca
- Class: Gastropoda
- Subclass: Caenogastropoda
- Order: Neogastropoda
- Family: Austrosiphonidae
- Genus: Kelletia; Bayle in P. Fischer, 1884

Type species
- Fusus kelletii Forbes, 1850

Species
- See text.

= Kelletia =

Kelletia Temporal range: Late Oligocene to Recent, 25.2–0.0 Ma

Genus of gastropods

Kelletia is a genus of large sea snails, whelks, a marine gastropod molluscs in the whelk family Austrosiphonidae.

== Distribution ==
One extant species Kelletia lischkei occurs in the Sea of Japan off the coasts of Japan and South Korea, and another K. kelletii is found of along the coasts of California, United States and in the Baja California, Mexico.

Fossil species are documented in Japan, California, and Ecuador.

== Evolution ==
A molecular phylogeny of Buccinidae based on the mitochondrial 16S rRNA gene suggested that Kelletia is a closely related to Penion, a whelk genus with extant species distributed in waters off of New Zealand and Australia. Results of a further molecular phylogenetic studies using mitochondrial genomic and nuclear ribosomal DNA sequence data re-affirmed this relationship, and also demonstrated that Kelletia and Antarctoneptunea found in the southern Pacific and Southern oceans are closely related. The common ancestor of the three genera most likely evolved in the southern Pacific Ocean, and a lineage leading to Kelletia dispersed over millions of years up the western coast of the Americas into the northern Pacific Ocean. Radulae and opercula morphology is similar between Penion and Kelletia.

Cladogram of Austrosiphonidae and Tudiclidae

- - - Antarctoneptunea
    - Kelletia
    - Penion
    - Serratifusus
- - Aeneator
  - Buccinulum
  - Euthria
  - Tasmeuthria

== Species ==
=== Extant Species ===
Image	Scientific name	Distribution
	Kelletia campbelli Poppe & Tagaro, 2026	
	Kelletia kelletii (Forbes, 1850)	Isla Asunción, Baja California, Mexico to Monterey, California, USA.
	Kelletia lischkei (Kuroda, T., 1938)	Sea of Japan, and is found in coastal waters off of South Korea

=== Fossils ===
- † Kelletia brevis (Ozaki, 1954)
- † Kelletia ecuadoriana (Olsson, 1964)
- † Kelletia kanakoffi (Hertlein, 1970)
- † Kelletia kettlemanensis (Arnold, 1910)
- † Kelletia lorata (Addicott, 1970)
- † Kelletia posoensis (Anderson & Martin, 1914)
- † Kelletia rugosa (Olsson, 1964)
- † Kelletia vladimiri (Kanakoff, 1954)
