= Aeneator prognaviter =

Scientific classification
- Kingdom: Animalia
- Phylum: Mollusca
- Class: Gastropoda
- Subclass: Caenogastropoda
- Order: Neogastropoda
- Family: Tudiclidae
- Genus: Aeneator
- Species: A. prognaviter

Binomial name
- Aeneator prognaviter Fraussen & Sellanes, 2008

Species of gastropod

Aeneator prognaviter is a species of sea snail, a marine gastropod mollusc in the family Tudiclidae.
