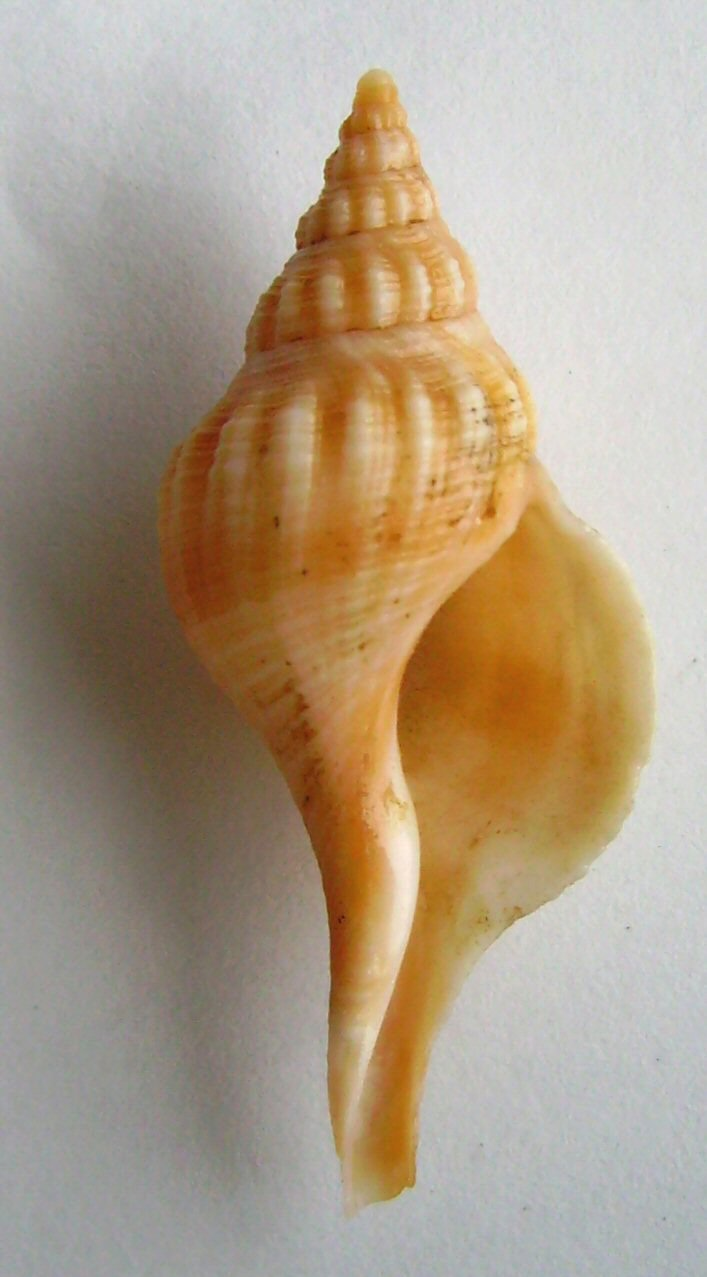
- An apertural view of a shell of Aeneator marshalli separabilis

Scientific classification
- Kingdom: Animalia
- Phylum: Mollusca
- Class: Gastropoda
- Subclass: Caenogastropoda
- Order: Neogastropoda
- Family: Tudiclidae
- Genus: Aeneator; Finlay, 1927

Type species
- † Verconella marshalli Murdoch, 1924

Species
- See text.

Synonyms
- Aenator [sic] (misspelling); Aeneator (Aeneator) Finlay, 1926 · accepted, alternate representation; Aeneator (Ellicea) Finlay, 1928 · accepted, alternate representation; Ellicea Finlay, 1928

= Aeneator (gastropod) =

Aeneator Temporal range: Late Miocene to Recent, 11.04–0.0 Ma

Genus of gastropods

Aeneator is a genus of sea snails, marine gastropod molluscs belonging to the whelk family Tudiclidae.

== Description ==
Aeneator is a genus of small to medium sized marine snails. Large shells and fossils of Aeneator can sometimes be confused with those of Penion.

== Distribution ==
Most extant species of Aeneator are found around New Zealand, Chile, and Antarctica. Numerous fossil species are also described from New Zealand.

== Evolution ==
Aeneator is closely related to the genus Buccinulum.

Cladogram of Austrosiphonidae and Tudiclidae

- - - Antarctoneptunea
    - Kelletia
    - Penion
    - Serratifusus
- - Aeneator
  - Buccinulum
  - Euthria
  - Tasmeuthria

== Species ==
Species in the genus Aeneator include:

- † (Ellicea) Aeneator antorbitus (Fleming, 1955)
- Aeneator attenuatus (Powell, 1927)
- Aeneator benthicolus (Dell, 1963)
- Aeneator castillai (H. S. Mclean & Andrade, 1982)
- Aeneator comptus (Finlay, 1924)
- † (Ellicea) Aeneator conformatus (Marwick, 1931)
- † Aeneator delicatulus (Powell, 1929)
- Aeneator elegans (Suter, 1917)
- Aenator fontainei (d'Orbigny, 1841)
- Aeneator galatheae (Powell, 1958)
- † (Ellicea) Aeneator henchmani (Marwick, 1926)
- † Aeneator huttoni (Finlay, 1930)
- Aeneator loisae (Rehder, 1971)
- † Aeneator marshalli marshalli (R. Murdoch, 1924)
  - Aeneator marshalli separabilis (Dell, 1956)
- Aeneator martae (Araya, 2013)
- † Aeneator nothopanax (Fleming, 1954)
- † (Ellicea) Aeneator orbitus (Hutton, 1885)
- Aeneator otagoensis (Finlay, 1930)
- Aeneator portentosus (Fraussen & Sellanes, 2008)
- † (Ellicea) Aeneator perobtusus (Fleming, 1943)
- † Aeneator problematicus (Fleming, 1943)
- Aeneator prognaviter (Fraussen & Sellanes, 2008)
- Aeneator recens (Dell, 1951)
- † Aeneator thomsoni (Marwick, 1924)
- † Aeneator valedictus (Watson, 1886)
- † (Ellicea) Aeneator validus (Marwick, 1928)
- † (Ellicea) Aeneator wairoanus (Marwick, 1965)
- † (Ellicea) Aeneator willetti (Fleming, 1955)

Species brought into synonymy

- Aeneator benthicola [sic]: synonym of Aeneator benthicolus Dell, 1963
- † Aeneator contractus Laws, 1940: synonym of † Penion haweraensis (A. W. B. Powell, 1931)
- † Aeneator huttoni Stilwell & Zinsmeister, 1992: synonym of † Prosipho stilwelli Beu, 2009
- Aeneator valedicta [sic] : synonym of Aeneator valedictus (Watson, 1886)
