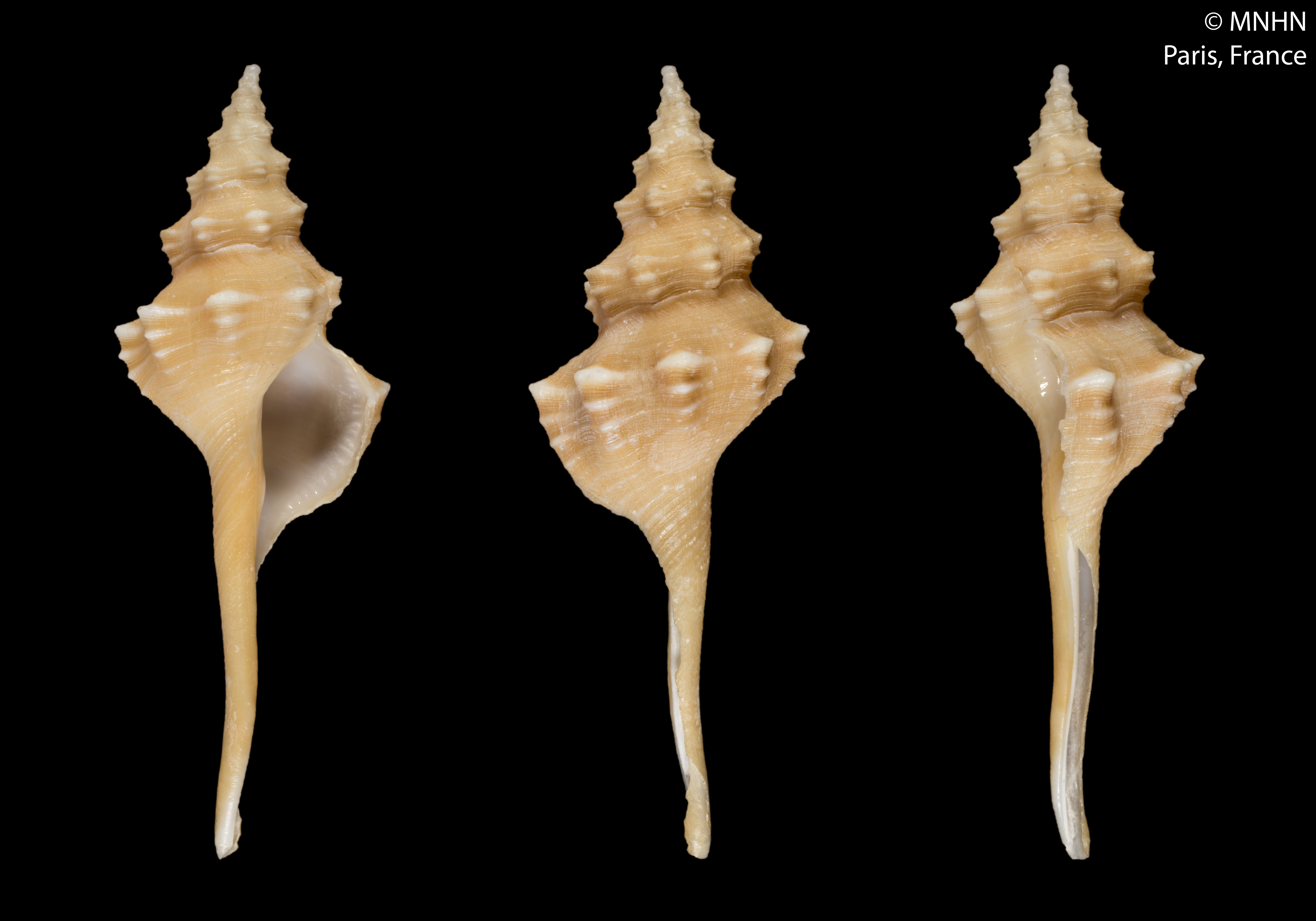
- Shell of Serratifusus sitanius (holotype at MNHN, Paris)

Scientific classification
- Kingdom: Animalia
- Phylum: Mollusca
- Class: Gastropoda
- Subclass: Caenogastropoda
- Order: Neogastropoda
- Family: Austrosiphonidae
- Genus: Serratifusus
- Species: S. sitanius

Binomial name
- Serratifusus sitanius Fraussen Hadorn, 2003

= Serratifusus sitanius =

Species of gastropod

Serratifusus sitanius is a species of sea snail, a marine gastropod mollusc in the family Austrosiphonidae. The name is said to derive from Latin word 'sitanius', meaning 'summer wheat'.

== Description ==
The length of the shell attains 61.4 mm.

== Distribution ==
This marine species occurs off New Caledonia (depth range: 600 –616 m).
