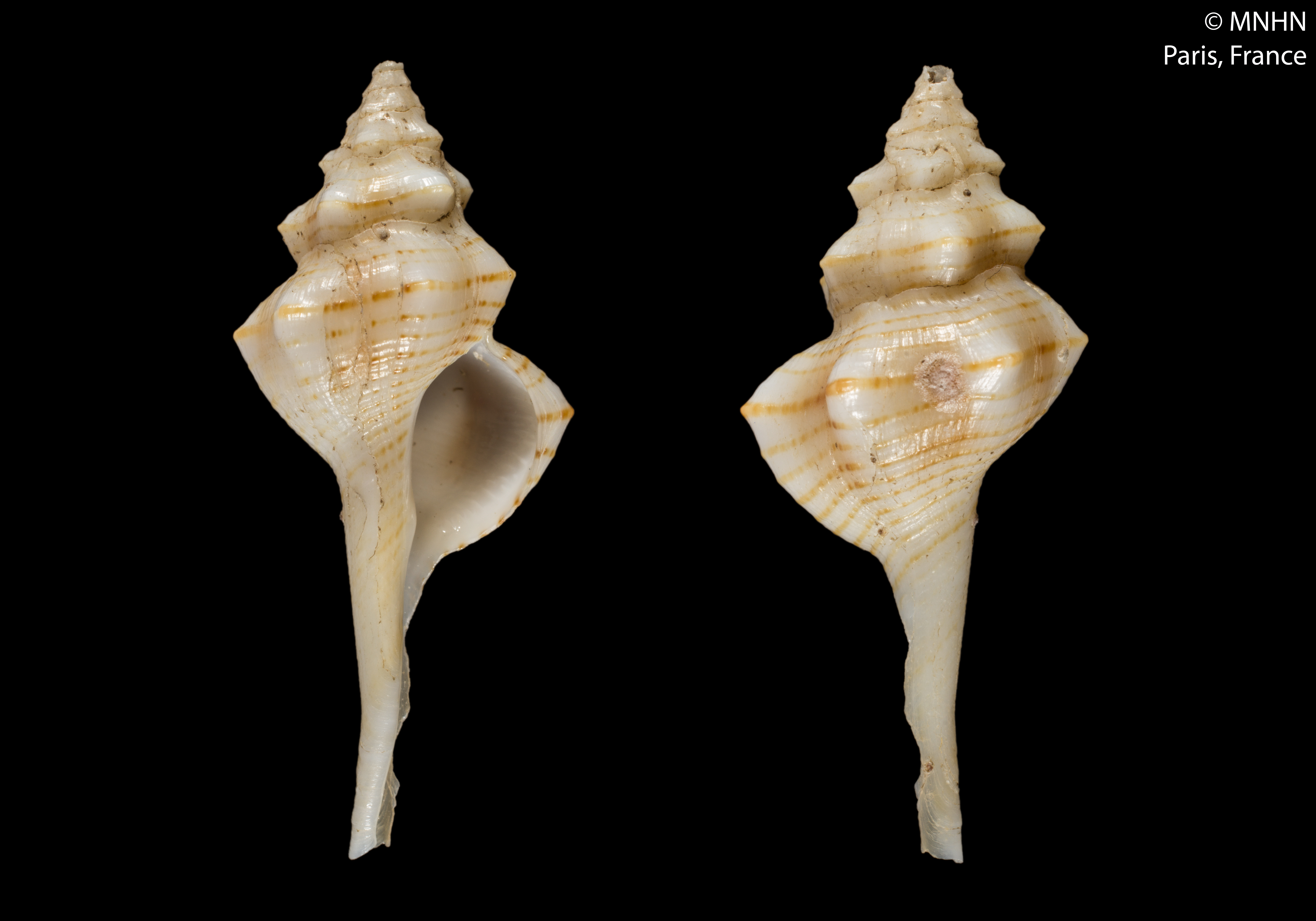
- Shell of Serratifusus excelens (holotype at MNHN? Paris)

Scientific classification
- Kingdom: Animalia
- Phylum: Mollusca
- Class: Gastropoda
- Subclass: Caenogastropoda
- Order: Neogastropoda
- Family: Austrosiphonidae
- Genus: Serratifusus
- Species: S. excelens

Binomial name
- Serratifusus excelens Fraussen Hadorn, 2003

= Serratifusus excelens =

Species of gastropod

Serratifusus excelens is a species of sea snail, a marine gastropod mollusc in the family Austrosiphonidae.

== Etymology ==
Named after the Latin expression excelens (sic - should be excellens) (adjective), meaning "high, exalted, lofty".

== Description ==
The length of the shell attains 36.4 mm.

== Distribution ==
This marine species occurs off New Caledonia (depth range: 370 –405 m).
