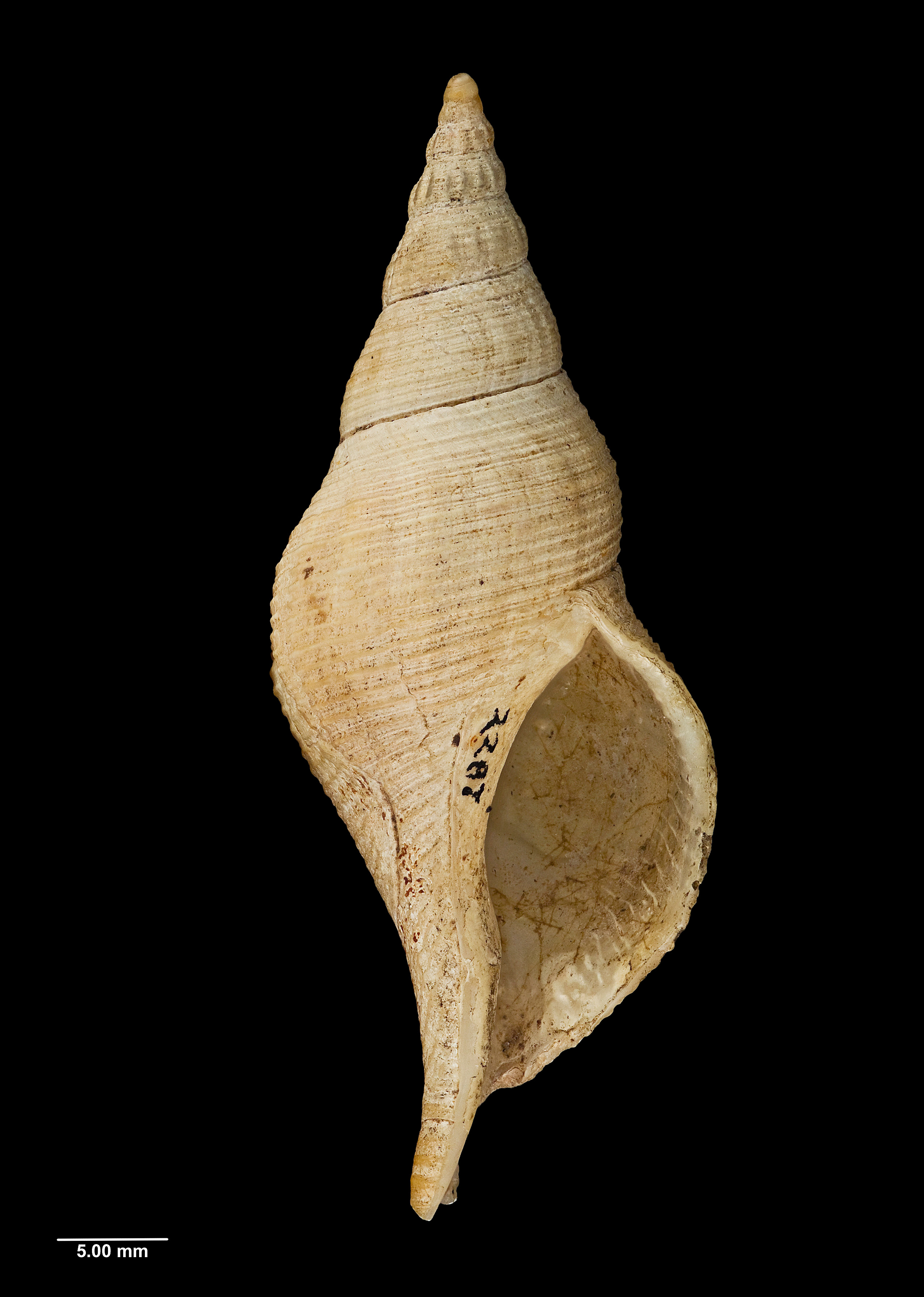
- Shell of Aeneator attenuatus (specimen at the Auckland War Memorial Museum)

Scientific classification
- Kingdom: Animalia
- Phylum: Mollusca
- Class: Gastropoda
- Subclass: Caenogastropoda
- Order: Neogastropoda
- Family: Tudiclidae
- Genus: Aeneator
- Species: A. attenuatus

Binomial name
- Aeneator attenuatus Powell, 1927

= Aeneator attenuatus =

Species of gastropod

Aeneator attenuatus is a species of sea snail or whelk, a marine gastropod mollusc in the family Tudiclidae.
