= Aeneator portentosus =

Scientific classification
- Kingdom: Animalia
- Phylum: Mollusca
- Class: Gastropoda
- Subclass: Caenogastropoda
- Order: Neogastropoda
- Family: Tudiclidae
- Genus: Aeneator
- Species: A. portentosus

Binomial name
- Aeneator portentosus Fraussen & Sellanes, 2008

Species of gastropod

Aeneator portentosus is a species of sea snail, a marine gastropod mollusc in the family Tudiclidae.
