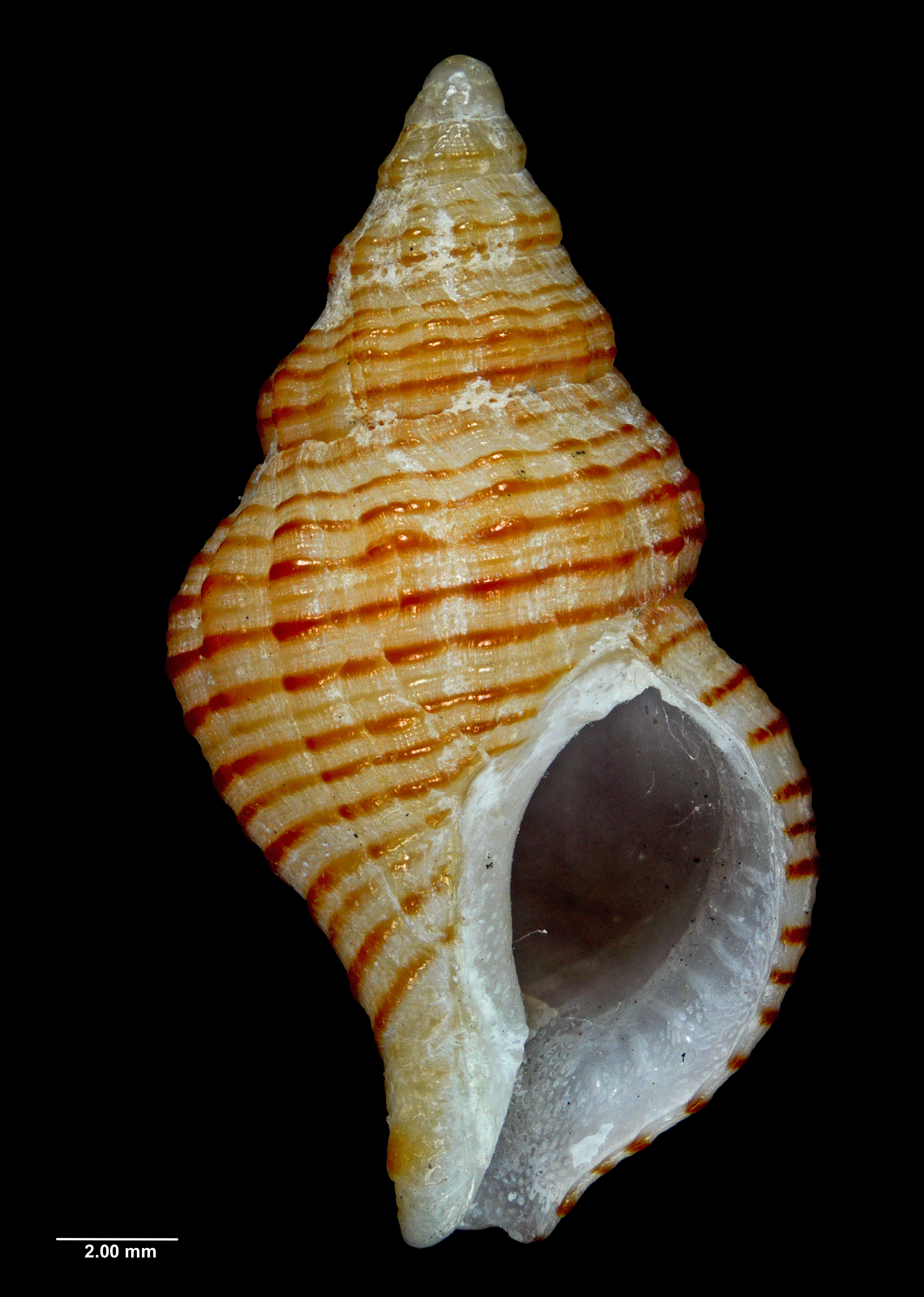
- Holotype of Buccinulum mariae from Auckland War Memorial Museum

Scientific classification
- Kingdom: Animalia
- Phylum: Mollusca
- Class: Gastropoda
- Subclass: Caenogastropoda
- Order: Neogastropoda
- Family: Tudiclidae
- Genus: Buccinulum
- Species: B. mariae

Binomial name
- Buccinulum mariae (Powell, 1940)

Synonyms
- Buccinulum (Euthrena) mariae (Powell, 1940)

= Buccinulum mariae =

Species of gastropod

Buccinulum mariae is a species of marine gastropod mollusc in the family Tudiclidae. It was first described by Baden Powell in 1940. It is endemic to the waters of New Zealand.

== Description ==
Buccinulum mariae are typically a dark reddish-brown colour, with some specimens exhibiting a lighter colour and darker spiral bands. The holotype of the species was 20 mm in height, with a diameter of between 10 and 75 mm, however specimens have been recorded as large as 26 millimetres in height.

== Distribution ==
The species is Endemic to New Zealand.
