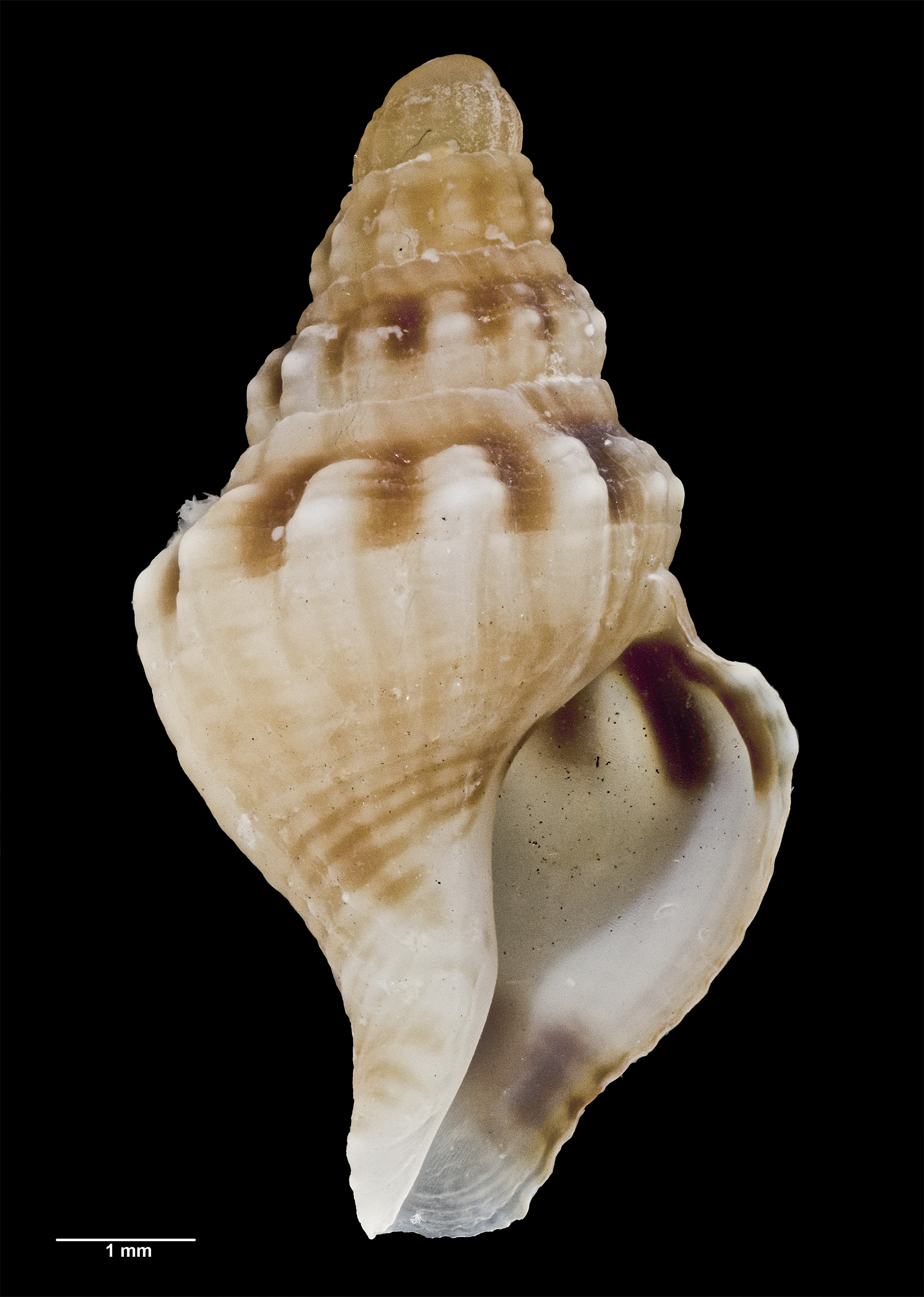

Scientific classification
- Kingdom: Animalia
- Phylum: Mollusca
- Class: Gastropoda
- Subclass: Caenogastropoda
- Order: Neogastropoda
- Family: Tudiclidae
- Genus: Buccinulum
- Species: B. robustum

Binomial name
- Buccinulum robustum (Powell, 1929)

Synonyms
- Buccinulum suteri Powell, 1934

= Buccinulum robustum =

Species of gastropod

Buccinulum robustum is a species of marine gastropod mollusc in the family Tudiclidae. It was first described by Baden Powell in 1929. It is endemic to the waters of New Zealand.

== Description ==
Buccinulum robustum is typically between 13 and 15 mm in length, and can grow up to 20.6 mm by 9 mm. It is recognisable by its strong axial ribs. Specimens vary in colour from black and pink to uniformly white. Some specimens of Buccinulum robustum were originally described as two different species (Buccinulum robustum and Buccinulum suteri), with the name Buccinulum suteri given to specimens with finer spiral sculptures. Buccinulum suteri was later synonymised with Buccinulum robustum.

== Distribution ==
The species is Endemic to New Zealand. The holotype was first identified at Port Fitzroy on Great Barrier Island. While primarily found on the east coast of the North Island, in 1995 the first specimens were identified to the west of the Aupouri Peninsula.
