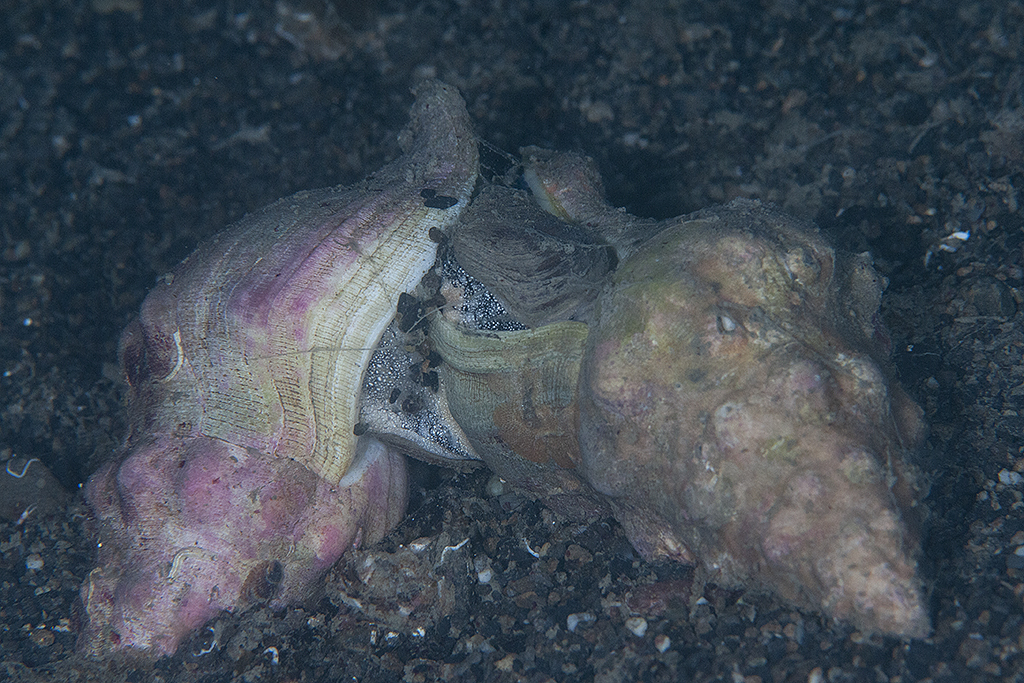
- Two live Kelletia lischkei snails

Scientific classification
- Kingdom: Animalia
- Phylum: Mollusca
- Class: Gastropoda
- Subclass: Caenogastropoda
- Order: Neogastropoda
- Family: Austrosiphonidae
- Genus: Kelletia
- Species: K. lischkei

Binomial name
- Kelletia lischkei (Oyama, K., 1951)

= Kelletia lischkei =

Kelletia lischkei Temporal range: Middle Pleistocene to Recent, 0.13–0.00 Ma

Species of gastropod

Kelletia lischkei is a species of large sea snail, or whelk, a marine gastropod mollusc in the family Austrosiphonidae.

== Description ==
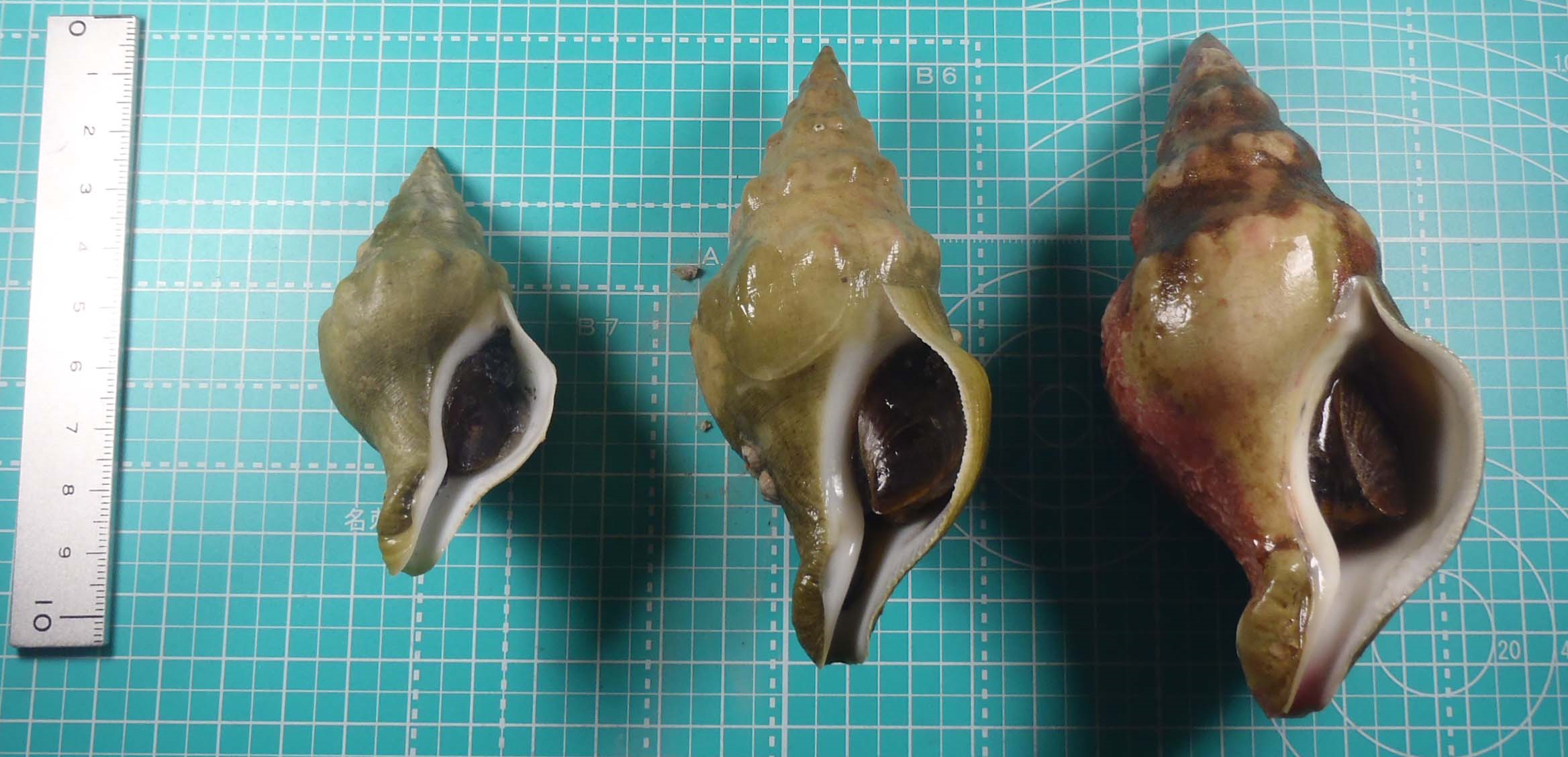
Three Kelletia lischkei snails

Kelletia lischkei is a medium-to-large species of buccinid whelk.

== Distribution ==
The species is endemic to the Sea of Japan, and is found in coastal waters off of South Korea and eastern Japan. Fossils of K. lischkei occur in the Middle Pleistocene fossil record of Japan, and the species bears a resemblance to the extinct fossil species Kelletia brevis.
