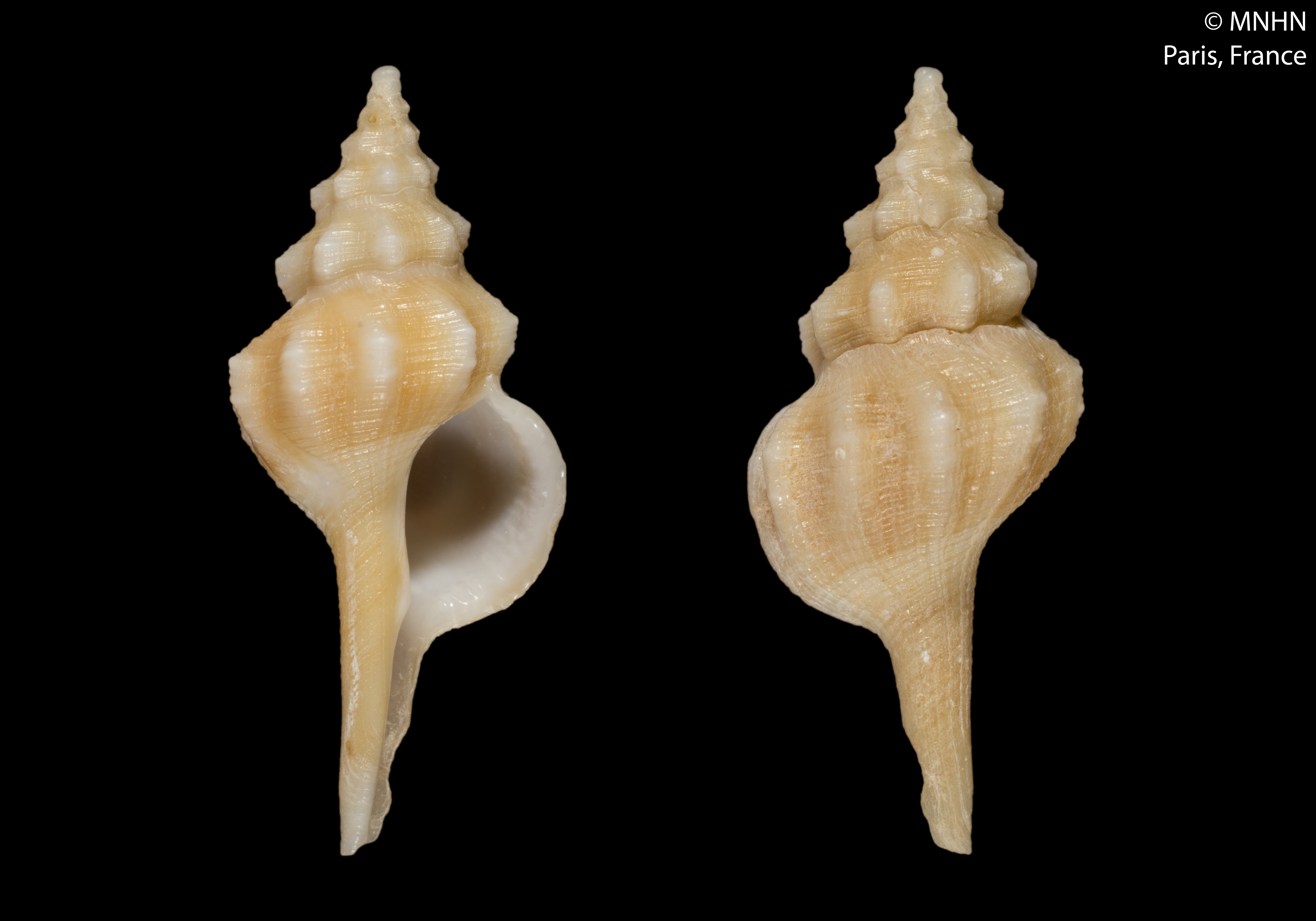
- Shell of Serratifusus harasewychi (holotype at MNHN, Paris)

Scientific classification
- Kingdom: Animalia
- Phylum: Mollusca
- Class: Gastropoda
- Subclass: Caenogastropoda
- Order: Neogastropoda
- Family: Austrosiphonidae
- Genus: Serratifusus
- Species: S. harasewychi

Binomial name
- Serratifusus harasewychi Fraussen Hadorn, 2003

= Serratifusus harasewychi =

Species of gastropod

Serratifusus harasewychi is a rare species of deep-water sea snail, a marine gastropod mollusc in the family Austrosiphonidae.

== Etymology ==
This species is named to honor Jerry Harasewych from the National Museum of Natural History, Smithsonian Institution, for his contributions the knowledge of columbariform molluscs.

== Description ==
The length of the shell attains 35.3 mm.

== Distribution ==
This marine species occurs off New Caledonia (depth range: 502–516 m).
