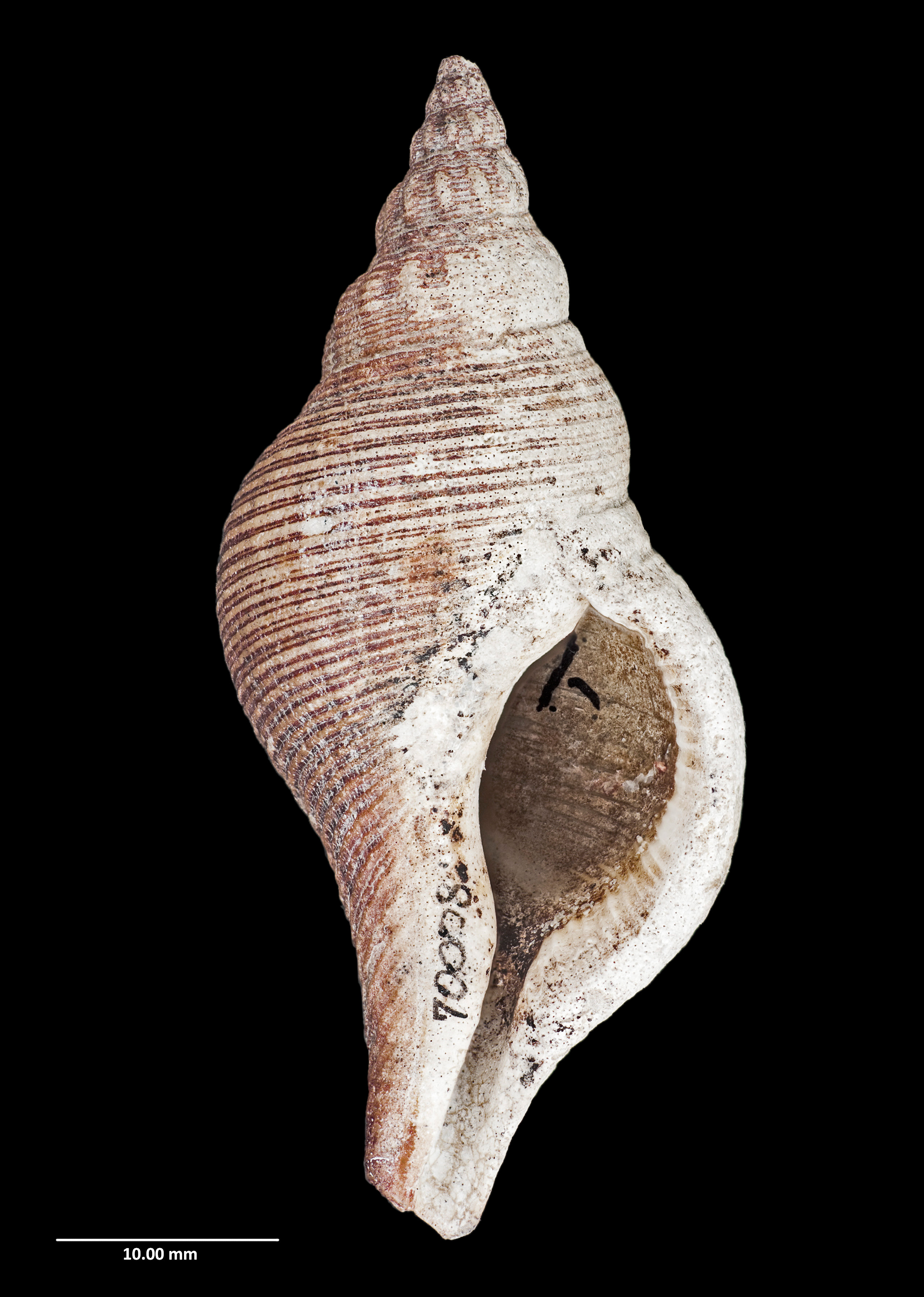
- Shell of Aeneator otagoensis (specimen at the Auckland War Memorial Museum)

Scientific classification
- Kingdom: Animalia
- Phylum: Mollusca
- Class: Gastropoda
- Subclass: Caenogastropoda
- Order: Neogastropoda
- Family: Tudiclidae
- Genus: Aeneator
- Species: A. otagoensis

Binomial name
- Aeneator otagoensis Finlay, 1930

Synonyms
- Aeneator otagoensis cookianus Dell, 1956

= Aeneator otagoensis =

Species of gastropod

Aeneator otagoensis is a species of large sea snail, a whelk, a marine gastropod mollusc in the family Tudiclidae.

== Distribution ==
New Zealand

== Description ==
Aeneator otagoensis was discovered and described by New Zealand malacologist Harold John Finlay in 1930. Finlay's type description reads as follows:

Aeneator otagoensis n. sp.

Very close to A. marshalli (Murdoch) (Trans. N.Z. Inst., vol. 55, p. 159, 1924), the genotype, from the Upper Pliocene of Castlecliff, and probably descended from it. Easily distinguished by fewer and stouter axials, 13 per whorl just before they die out, instead of about 18; interstices equal to or wider than ribs instead of narrower or sublinear. Spirals somewhat finer, less raised than in marshalli. Spire taller, considerably higher than aperture instead of subequal to it. Pillar considerably thicker.

Height, 55 mm.; of spire, 23 mm.; width, 24 mm.

Locality—22 fathoms, trawled between Otago Heads and Waikouwaiti, type and one other. Also two shells from 60 fathoms off Otago Heads, and one worn cast up shell, Taieri Beach.

Type in Finlay collection.

Perhaps all the Recent records of marshalli refer to this species.
