= Aeneator recens =

Scientific classification
- Kingdom: Animalia
- Phylum: Mollusca
- Class: Gastropoda
- Subclass: Caenogastropoda
- Order: Neogastropoda
- Family: Tudiclidae
- Genus: Aeneator
- Species: A. recens

Binomial name
- Aeneator recens (Dell, 1951)

Synonyms
- Ellicea recens Dell, 1951

Species of gastropod

Aeneator recens is a species of large sea snail, a whelk, a marine gastropod mollusc in the family Tudiclidae.
