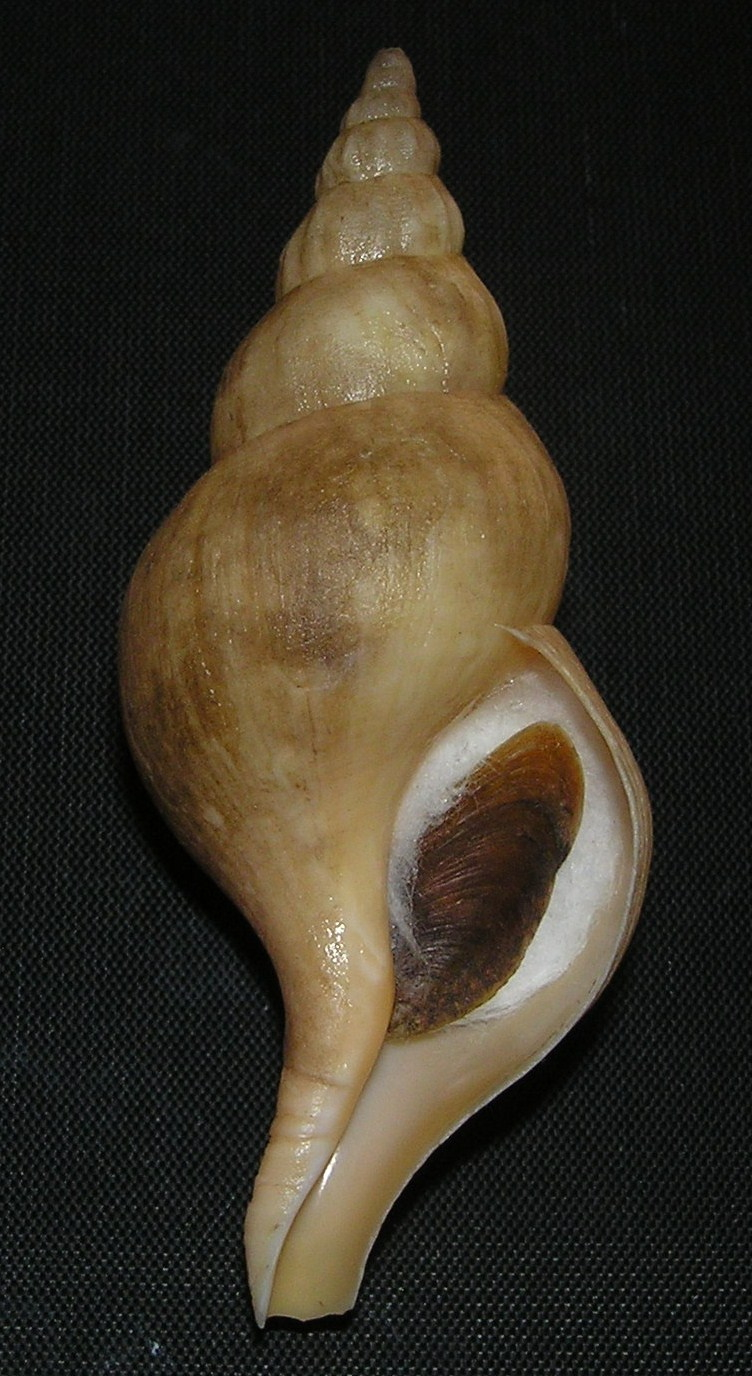
- Apertural view of a shell of Antarctoneptunea benthicola

Scientific classification
- Kingdom: Animalia
- Phylum: Mollusca
- Class: Gastropoda
- Subclass: Caenogastropoda
- Order: Neogastropoda
- Family: Austrosiphonidae
- Genus: Antarctoneptunea
- Species: A. benthicola

Binomial name
- Antarctoneptunea benthicola (Dell, 1956)

Synonyms
- Penion benthicolus Dell, 1956; Penion benthicolus delli Powell, 1971.

= Antarctoneptunea benthicola =

Antarctoneptunea benthicola Temporal range: Early Pleistocene to Recent, 2.4–0.0 Ma

Species of gastropod

Antarctoneptunea benthicola is a species of small-to-medium-sized predatory sea snail or whelk, a marine gastropod mollusc in the family Austrosiphonidae.

== Description ==
Antarctoneptunea benthicola is a small-to-medium-sized species of marine snail in the genus Antarctoneptunea, the shell reaches 100 mm in height and 40 mm in diameter.

== Distribution ==
This species is endemic to New Zealand. The species occurs in deep-water, and its range extends from off the northern coast of the North Island to the New Zealand Subantarctic Islands.

A. benthicola also has a Pleistocene fossil record in the South Island.

== Taxonomy ==
The species was formerly recognised as Penion benthicolus, but evolutionary trees based on mitochondrial and nuclear ribosomal DNA sequence data, as well as geometric morphometric analysis of shell shape and size, indicate that the species belongs to Antarctoneptunea.

A subspecies, Penion benthicolus delli Powell, 1971 was formerly recognized, but this taxon has since been demonstrated to be indistinguishable from other P. benthicolus based on shell morphology.
