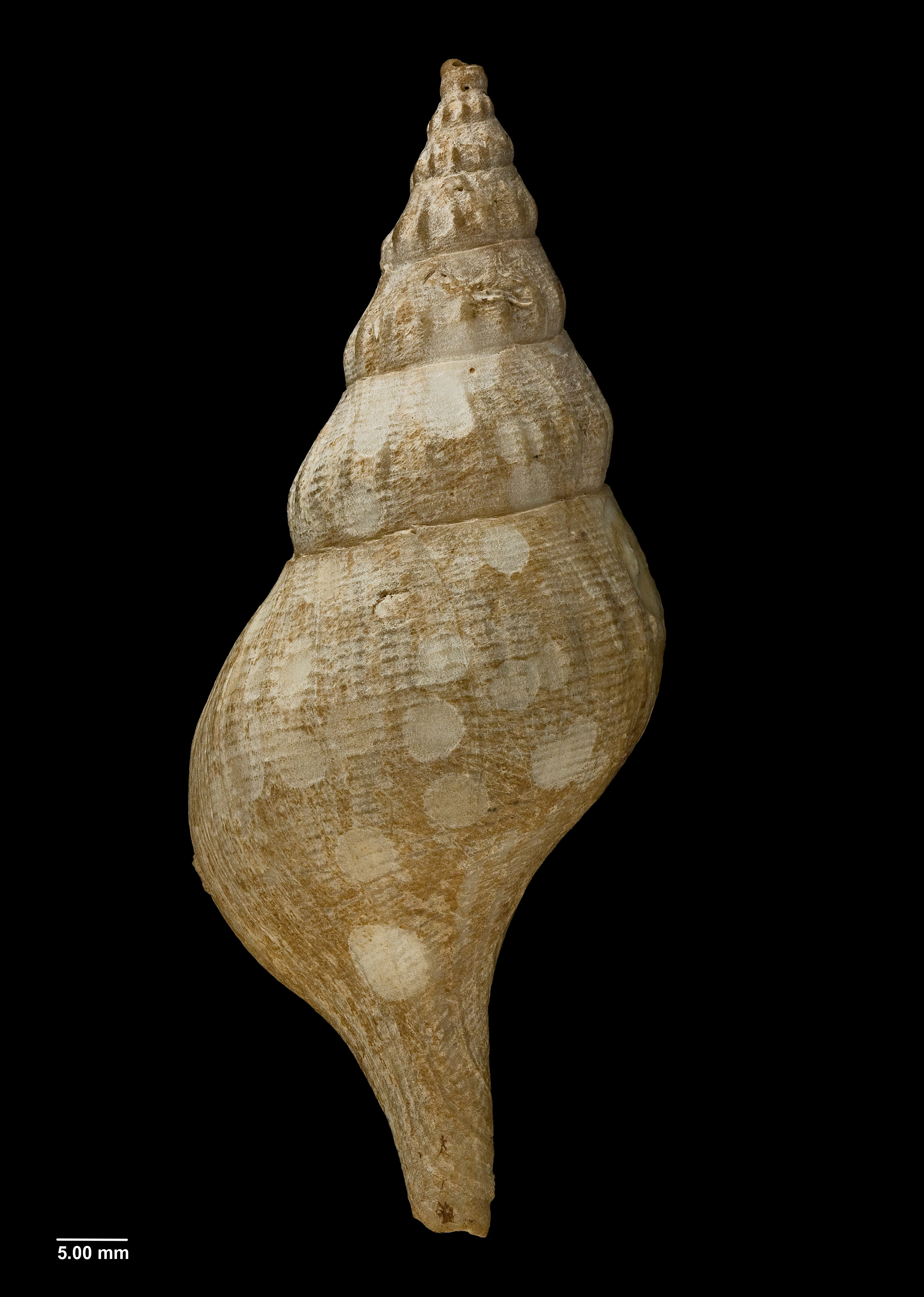
- Shell of Antarctoneptunea benthicola (specimen at the Auckland War Memorial Museum)

Scientific classification
- Kingdom: Animalia
- Phylum: Mollusca
- Class: Gastropoda
- Subclass: Caenogastropoda
- Order: Neogastropoda
- Family: Austrosiphonidae
- Genus: Antarctoneptunea; Dell, 1972

= Antarctoneptunea =

Antarctoneptunea Temporal range: Early Pleistocene to Recent, 2.4–0.0 Ma

Genus of gastropods

Antarctoneptunea is a genus of sea snails, marine gastropod mollusks in the whelk family Austrosiphonidae.

== Distribution ==
Antarctoneptunea marine snails occur in deep water surrounding New Zealand and in Southern Ocean encircling Antarctica, particularly in the Ross Sea.

== Evolution ==
Molecular phylogenetic trees based on mitochondrial genomic and nuclear ribosomal DNA sequence data indicate that Antarctoneptunea is closely related to the Northern Hemisphere genus Kelletia, and Penion siphon whelks found in waters surrounding New Zealand and Australia. It has been suggested that some Antarctic fossil species of Penion are misclassified Antarctoneptunea.

Cladogram of Austrosiphonidae and Tudiclidae

- - - Antarctoneptunea
    - Kelletia
    - Penion
    - Serratifusus
- - Aeneator
  - Buccinulum
  - Euthria
  - Tasmeuthria

== Species ==
Species within the genus Antarctoneptunea include:

- Antarctoneptunea aurora (Hedley, 1916)
- Antarctoneptunea benthicola (Dell, 1956)

Species brought into synonymy

- Penion benthicolus delli Powell, 1971: synonym of Antarctoneptunea benthicola (Dell, 1956)
