= Aeneator valedictus =

Scientific classification
- Kingdom: Animalia
- Phylum: Mollusca
- Class: Gastropoda
- Subclass: Caenogastropoda
- Order: Neogastropoda
- Family: Tudiclidae
- Genus: Aeneator
- Species: A. valedictus

Binomial name
- Aeneator valedictus (Watson, 1886)

Synonyms
- Fusus valedictus Watson, 1886

Species of gastropod

Aeneator valedictus is a species of sea snail, a whelk, a marine gastropod mollusc in the family Tudiclidae.
