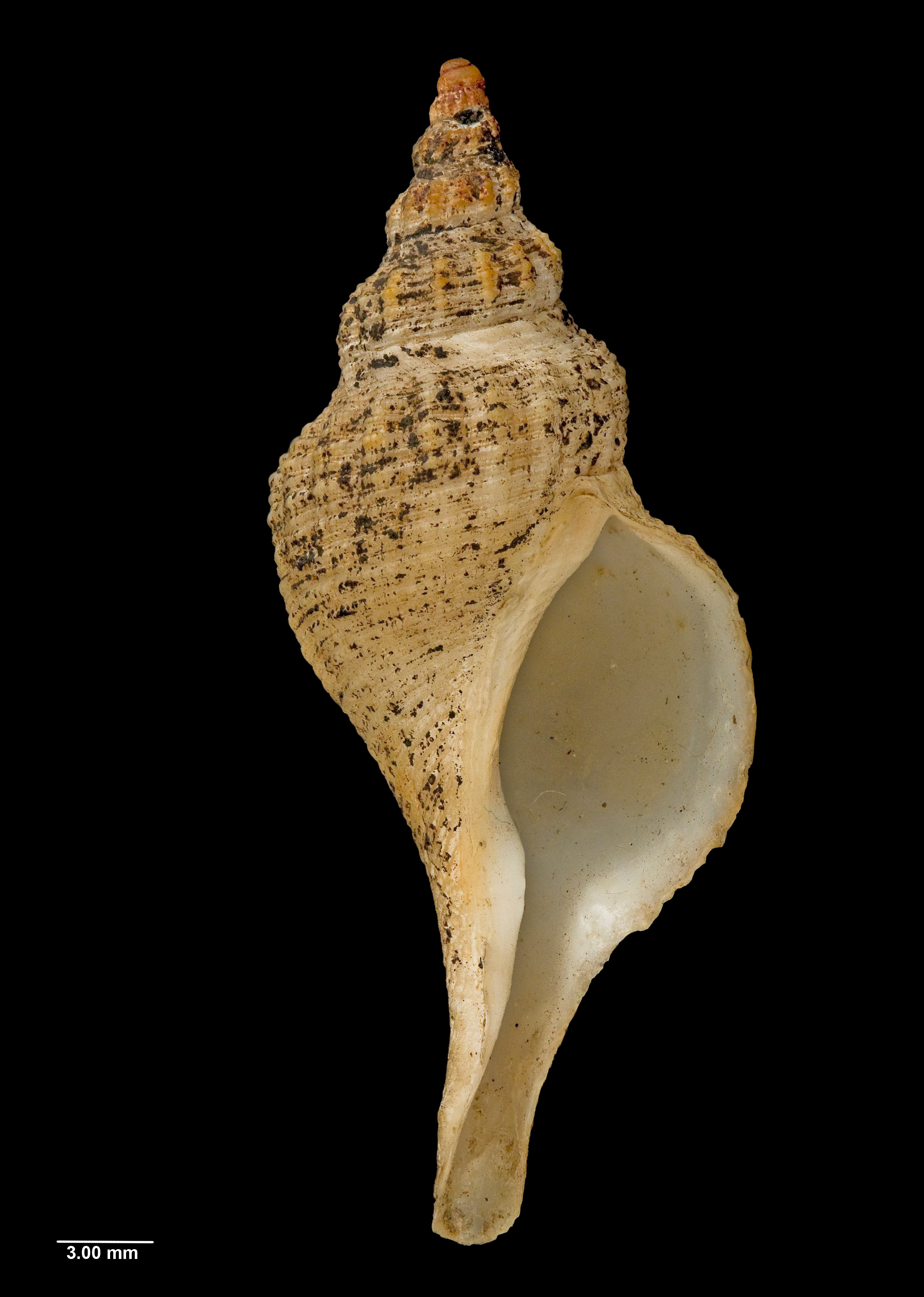
- Aeneator comptus shell

Scientific classification
- Kingdom: Animalia
- Phylum: Mollusca
- Class: Gastropoda
- Subclass: Caenogastropoda
- Order: Neogastropoda
- Family: Tudiclidae
- Genus: Aeneator
- Species: A. comptus

Binomial name
- Aeneator comptus (Finlay, 1924)

Synonyms
- Verconella compta Finlay, 1924

= Aeneator comptus =

Species of gastropod

Aeneator comptus is a species of large sea snail, a whelk, a marine gastropod mollusc in the family Tudiclidae.
