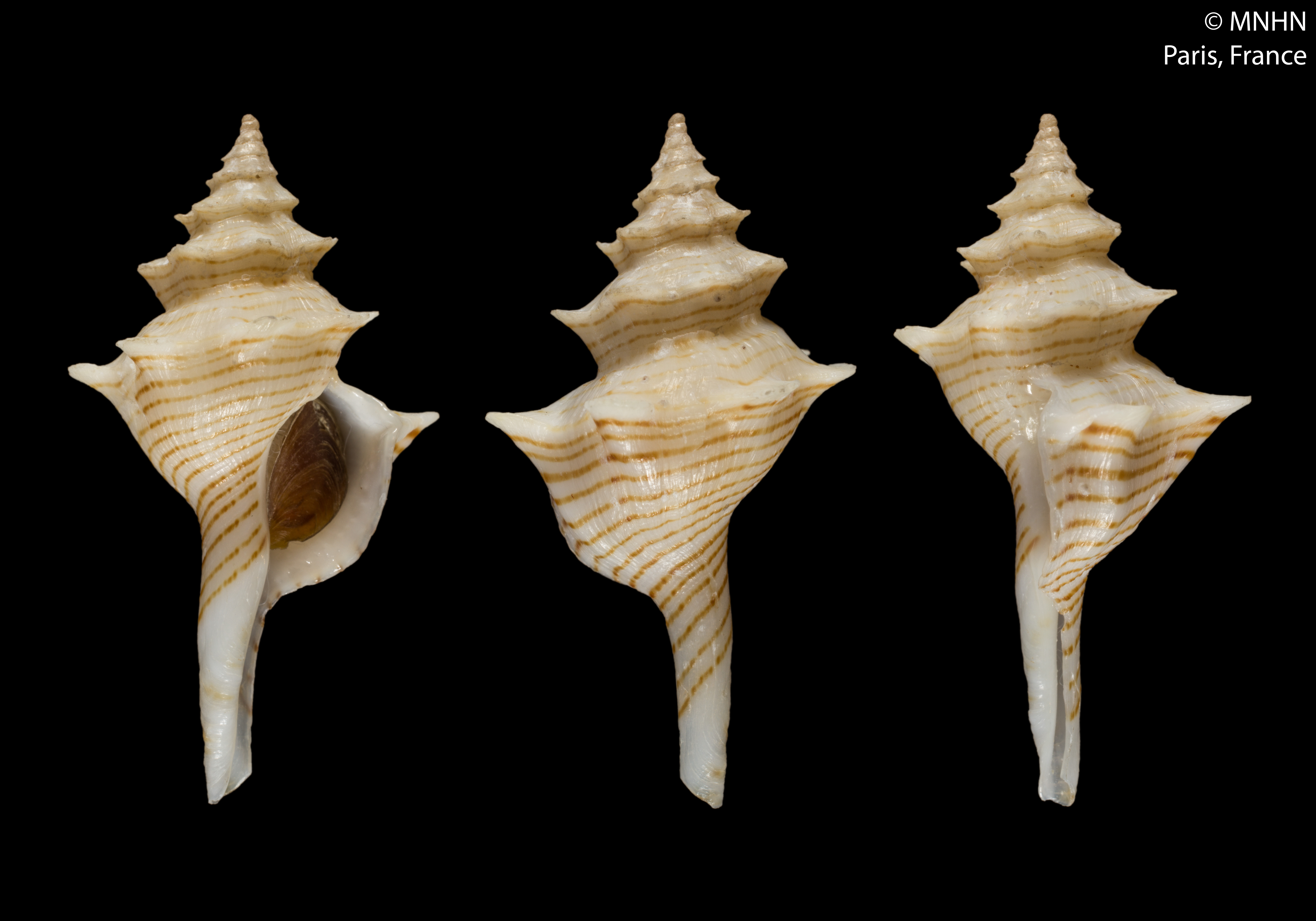
- Shell of Serratifusus lineatus (holotype at MNHN, Paris)

Scientific classification
- Kingdom: Animalia
- Phylum: Mollusca
- Class: Gastropoda
- Subclass: Caenogastropoda
- Order: Neogastropoda
- Superfamily: Buccinoidea
- Family: Austrosiphonidae
- Genus: Serratifusus; Darragh, 1969

Type species
- †Fusus craspedotus Tate, 1888

= Serratifusus =

Genus of gastropods

Serratifusus is a genus of sea snails, marine gastropod molluscs in the whelk family Austrosiphonidae.

== Species ==
Species within the genus Serratifusus include:

- † Serratifusus craspedotus (Tate, 1888)
- Serratifusus excelens Fraussen Hadorn, 2003
- Serratifusus harasewychi Fraussen Hadorn, 2003
- Serratifusus lineatus Harasewych, 1991
- Serratifusus sitanius Fraussen Hadorn, 2003
- Serratifusus virginiae Harasewych, 1991

Cladogram of Austrosiphonidae and Tudiclidae

- - - Antarctoneptunea
    - Kelletia
    - Penion
    - Serratifusus
- - Aeneator
  - Buccinulum
  - Euthria
  - Tasmeuthria
