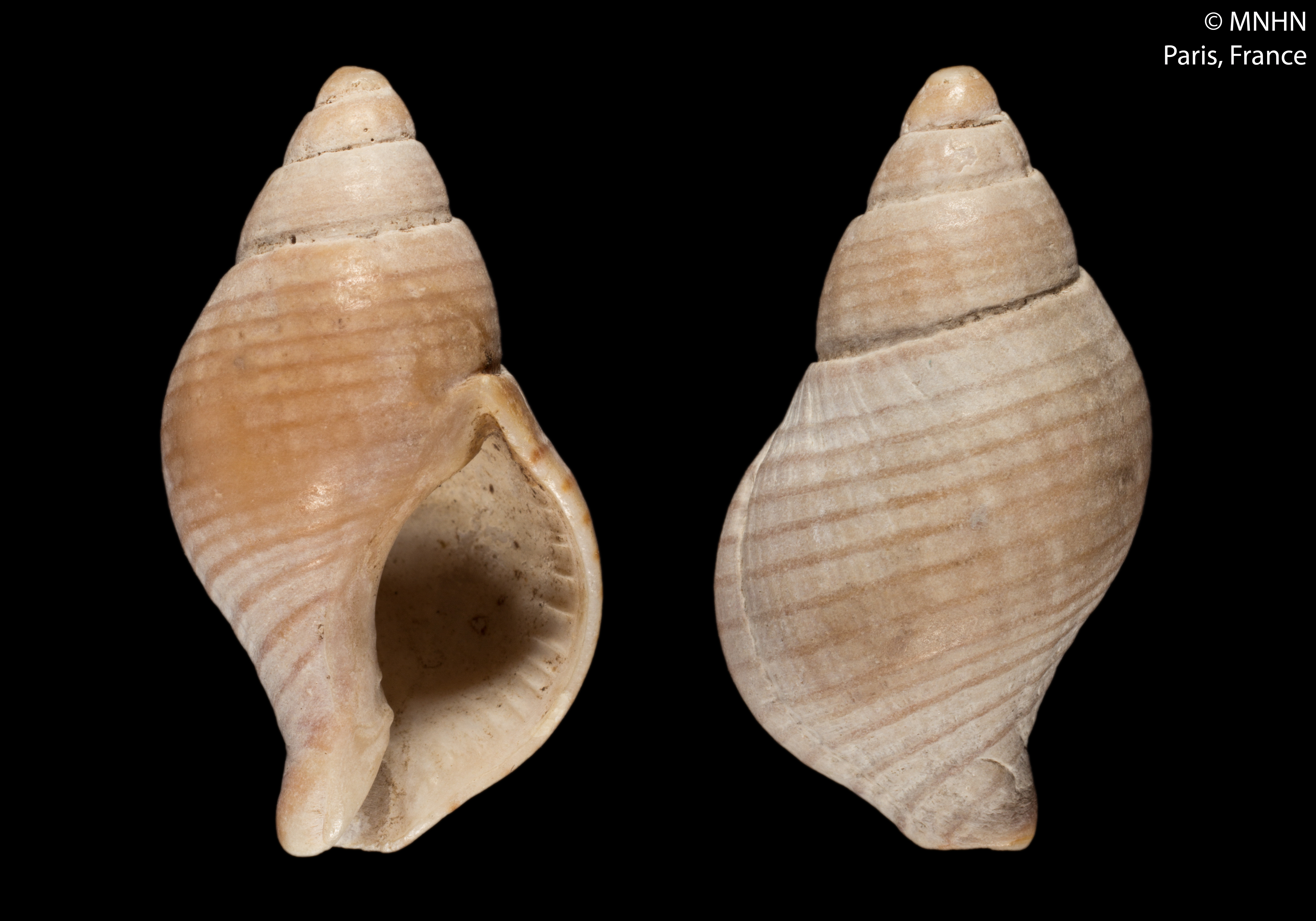
- Shell (lectotype at MNHN, Paris)

Scientific classification
- Kingdom: Animalia
- Phylum: Mollusca
- Class: Gastropoda
- Subclass: Caenogastropoda
- Order: Neogastropoda
- Family: Tudiclidae
- Genus: Buccinulum
- Species: B. linea

Binomial name
- Buccinulum linea (Martyn, 1784)

Synonyms
- List: Buccinulum (Chathamina) characteristica Finlay, 1928; Buccinulum (Evarnula) caelatum Powell, 1929; Buccinulum (Evarnula) gracillimum Powell, 1934; Buccinulum (Evarnula) multilineum Powell, 1929; Buccinulum (Evarnula) squalidum Powell, 1929; Buccinulum (Evarnula) sufflatum Finlay, 1926; Buccinulum caelatum Powell, 1929; Buccinulum multilineum Powell, 1929; Buccinulum squalidum Powell, 1929; Buccinulum sufflatum Finlay, 1926; Buccinulum waitangiensis Powell, 1933; Buccinum linea Martyn, 1784 (basionym); Cominella striata Hutton, 1875 †; Euthria lineata "Martyn"; Fusus chemnitzii Anton, 1838; Fusus linea Martyn, 1784; Fusus lineatus Quoy & Gaimard, 1833; Murex lineatus Gmelin, 1791; Verconella dubia Marwick, 1924 †; Verconella thomsoni Marwick, 1924 †

= Buccinulum linea =

Species of gastropod

Buccinulum linea, commonly known as the lined whelk, is a species of marine gastropod mollusc in the family Tudiclidae. It is found only in New Zealand, including the Chatham Islands.
