= Aeneator elegans =

Scientific classification
- Kingdom: Animalia
- Phylum: Mollusca
- Class: Gastropoda
- Subclass: Caenogastropoda
- Order: Neogastropoda
- Family: Tudiclidae
- Genus: Aeneator
- Species: A. elegans

Binomial name
- Aeneator elegans (Suter, 1917)

Species of gastropod

Aeneator elegans is a species of large deepwater sea snail, a whelk, a marine gastropod mollusc in the family Tudiclidae.
