= Aeneator benthicolus =

Scientific classification
- Kingdom: Animalia
- Phylum: Mollusca
- Class: Gastropoda
- Subclass: Caenogastropoda
- Order: Neogastropoda
- Family: Tudiclidae
- Genus: Aeneator
- Species: A. benthicolus

Binomial name
- Aeneator benthicolus Dell, 1963

Synonyms
- Aeneator benthicola [sic] (misspelling); Ellicea benthicolus Dell, 1963

Species of gastropod

Aeneator benthicolus is a species of large sea snail, a whelk, a marine gastropod mollusc in the family Tudiclidae.

== Description ==
The length of the shell attains 83 mm, its diameter is 40 mm.

== Distribution ==
This marine species is endemic to New Zealand and occurs off North Island to Bay of Plenty.
