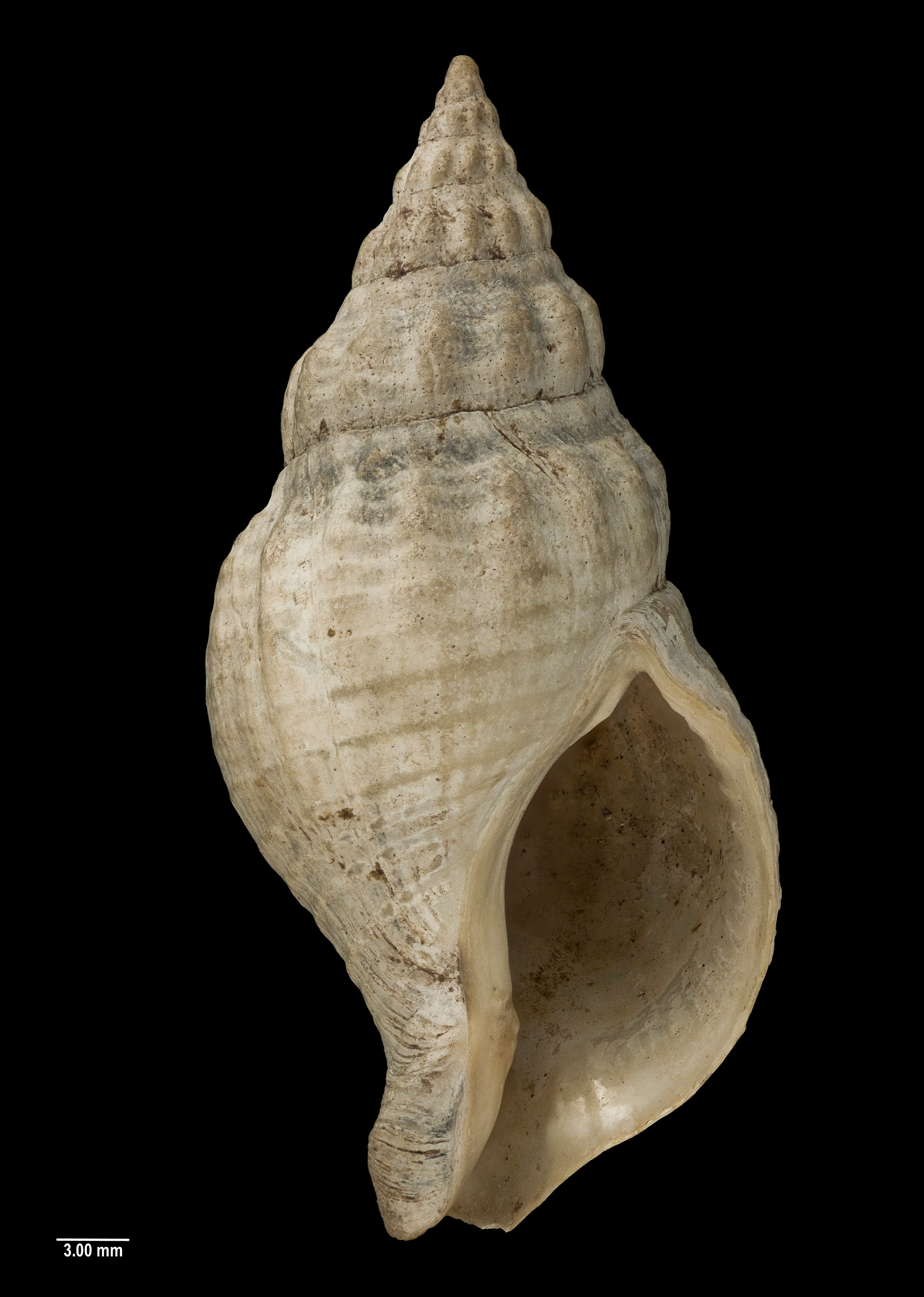

Scientific classification
- Kingdom: Animalia
- Phylum: Mollusca
- Class: Gastropoda
- Subclass: Caenogastropoda
- Order: Neogastropoda
- Family: Tudiclidae
- Genus: Buccinulum
- Species: B. pertinax

Binomial name
- Buccinulum pertinax (Martens, 1878)

Synonyms
- Buccinulum mutabile Powell, 1929; Buccinulum marwicki (Finlay, 1928); Buccinulum marwicki stewartianum Powell, 1929

= Buccinulum pertinax =

Species of gastropod

Buccinulum pertinax is a species of marine gastropod mollusc in the family Tudiclidae. It was first described by Eduard von Martens in 1878. It is endemic to the waters of New Zealand.

== Description ==
Buccinulum pertinax is a tall spired carnivore. The species measures 55 millimetres by 25 millimetres. The subspecies Buccinulum pertinax finlayi is distinguished by having heavier spiral cords.

== Subspecies ==
Buccinulum pertinax has two subspecies, Buccinulum pertinax pertinax based on von Martens' original description, and Buccinulum pertinax finlayi, which was identified as a subspecies by Baden Powell in 1929.

== Distribution ==
The species is endemic to New Zealand. Buccinulum pertinax pertinax is found in the southern islands of New Zealand, including Stewart Island and the Auckland Islands, while Buccinulum pertinax finlayi is found north of this range, up to Cook Strait. In the waters of the Otago Region, intermediate forms between the two subspecies can be found. In 2005, a specimen of Buccinulum pertinax pertinax was found off the coast of Raglan, vastly extending its known range.

The species is commonly found underneath boulders.
