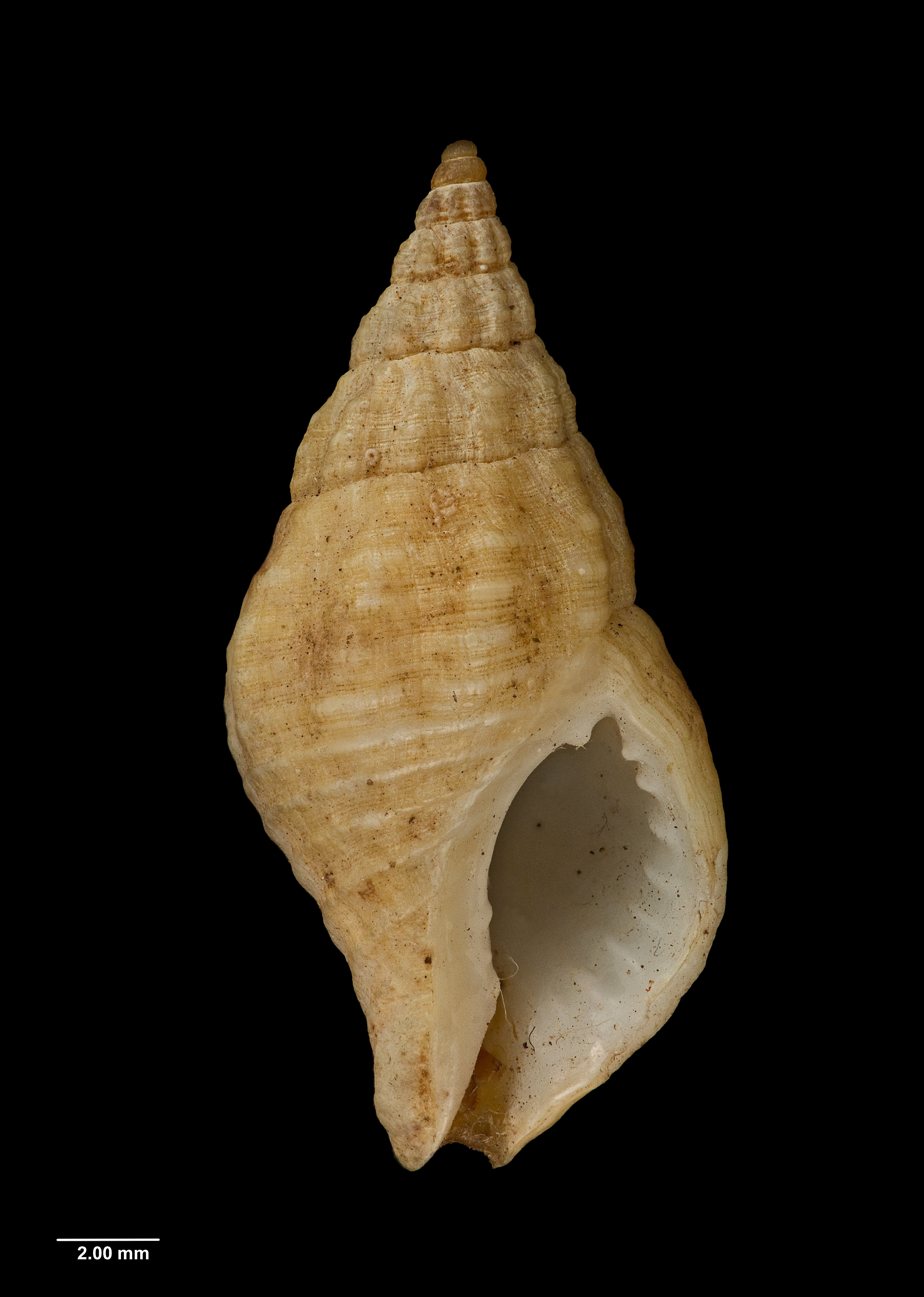
- Buccinulum vittatum vittatum
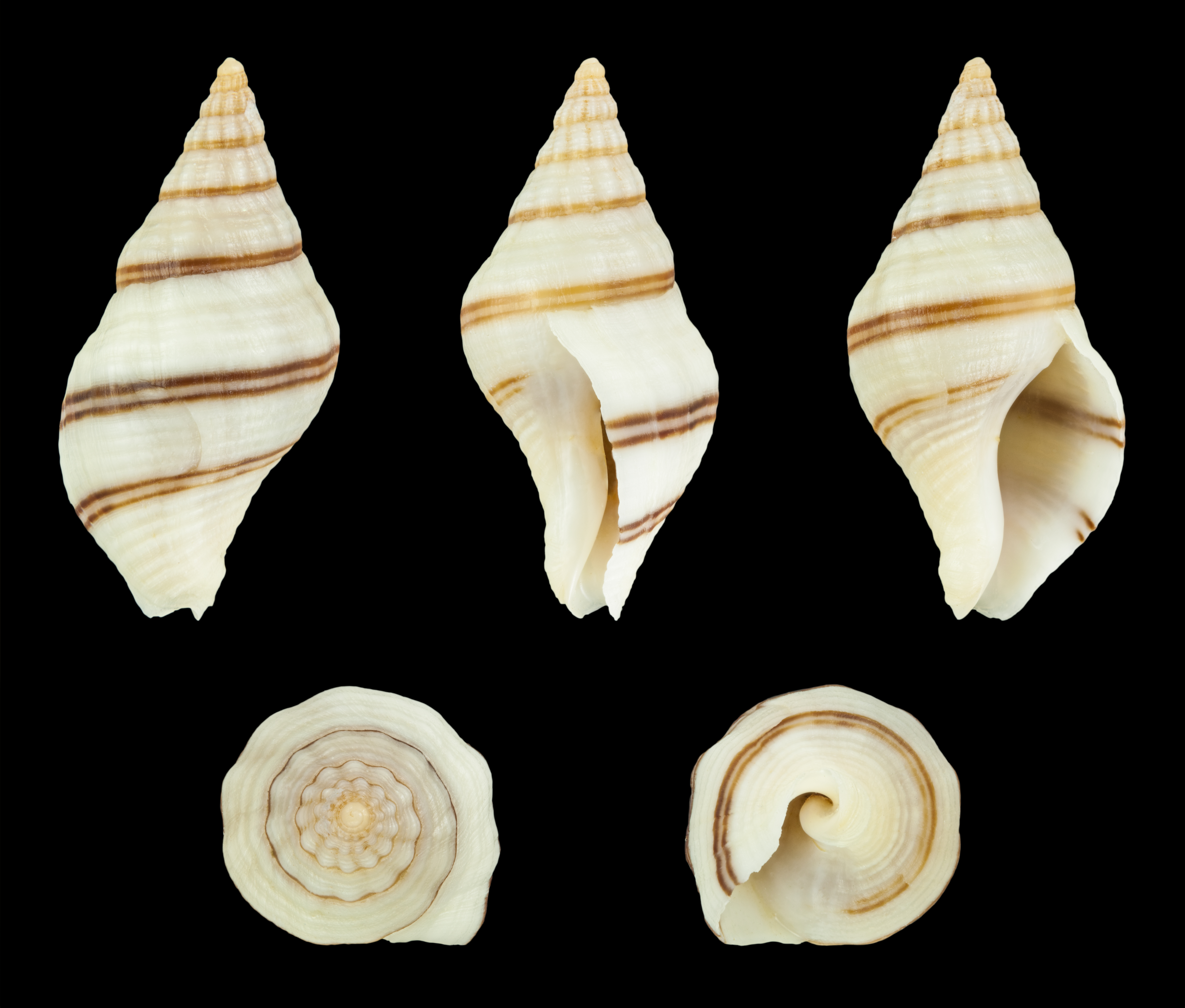
- Buccinulum vittatum bicinctum

Scientific classification
- Kingdom: Animalia
- Phylum: Mollusca
- Class: Gastropoda
- Subclass: Caenogastropoda
- Order: Neogastropoda
- Family: Tudiclidae
- Genus: Buccinulum
- Species: B. vittatum

Binomial name
- Buccinulum vittatum (Quoy & Gaimard, 1833)

Synonyms
- Buccinulum (Euthrena) heteromorphum Powell, 1929; Buccinulum (Euthrena) heteromorphum bucknilli Powell, 1929; Buccinulum (Euthrena) heteromorphum heteromorphum Powell, 1929; Buccinulum (Euthrena) kaikouraense Powell, 1929; Buccinulum (Euthrena) maketuense Powell, 1929; Buccinulum (Euthrena) motutaraense Powell, 1929; Buccinulum (Euthrena) strebeli Suter, 1908; Buccinulum (Euthrena) strebeli exsculptum Powell, 1929; Buccinulum (Euthrena) strebeli mestayerae Powell, 1929; Buccinulum heteromorphum Powell, 1929; Buccinulum heteromorphum bucknilli Powell, 1929; Buccinulum heteromorphum heteromorphum Powell, 1929; Buccinulum kaikouraense Powell, 1929; Buccinulum maketuense Powell, 1929; Buccinulum motutaraense Powell, 1929; Buccinulum strebeli exsculptum Powell, 1929; Buccinulum strebeli mestayerae Powell, 1929; Buccinulum vittatum vittatum (Quoy & Gaimard, 1833)· accepted, alternate representation; Buccinum trileatum Reeve, 1846; Euthria littorinoides costulata Suter, 1913; Euthria martensiana Hutton, 1878; Euthria strebeli Suter, 1908; Fusus vittatus Quoy & Gaimard, 1833 (basionym); Pisania flavescens Hutton, 1884

= Buccinulum vittatum =

Species of gastropod

Buccinulum vittatum is a species of sea snail, a marine gastropod mollusc in the family Tudiclidae.

== Distribution ==
This species is endemic to New Zealand. It is found all around New Zealand and as far south as the New Zealand subantarctic islands. The species was first documented in 1833 by Jean René Constant Quoy and Joseph Paul Gaimard.

== Taxonomy ==
Four subspecies were previously recognised but they are currently considered to be taxonomically invalid based on shell morphology and genetic data. B. v. vittatum (the nominate subspecies Buccinulum vittatum vittatum) is found in the northern half of the North Island; B. v. bicinctum is found on the Chatham Islands; B. colensoi is found on the South-East coast of the North island; B. v. littorinoides in Cook Strait, the sub-Antarctic islands and South Island.

== Description ==
The shell of this species is about 25mm in length.
