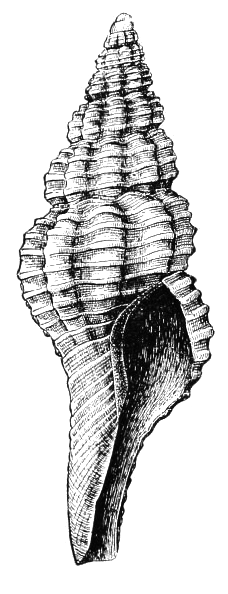

Scientific classification
- Kingdom: Animalia
- Phylum: Mollusca
- Class: Gastropoda
- Subclass: Caenogastropoda
- Order: Neogastropoda
- Family: Fasciolariidae
- Genus: Fusinus
- Species: F. aepynotus

Binomial name
- Fusinus aepynotus (Dall, 1889)

Synonyms
- Fusus aepynotus Dall, 1889; Harasewychia aepynotus (Dall, 1889)

= Fusinus aepynotus =

Species of gastropod

Fusinus aepynotus, known as the graceful spindle, is a species of small sea snail native to the Gulf of Mexico and southern Florida.

== Taxonomy ==
The first specimens of Fusinus aepynotus known to science were dredged by the United States Coast Survey steamer Blake between 1877 and 1878. William Healey Dall, who had been tasked with describing the mollusk collection of the Blake, named F. aepynotus in 1889 as one of several new species of Fusus from the collection. In 1904, Amadeus W. Grabau suggested that several species of Fusus collected by the Blake, including F. aepynotus, probably should be assigned to new genera, and that they may be descendants of the fossil genus Falsifusus. Due to historical nomenclatural confusion that was not fully resolved by the International Commission on Zoological Nomenclature until 1994, the genus Fusus was eventually replaced by Fusinus. In 1987, Petuch proposed classifying F. aepynotus in Harasewychia, but in 2000, Hadorn and Rogers disputed this classification and returned the species to Fusinus. Hadorn and Rogers also recognized that two of the shells that Dall had assigned to F. aepynotus represented a distinct species, which they named Fusinus thompsoni. In 2018, Vermeij and Snyder revised the taxonomy of large species of Fusinus, which they restricted to a group species from the Indo–West Pacific region. F. aepynotus was not one of the species they listed as belonging to their restricted concept of Fusinus. In 2019, Lyons and Snyder considered the species not addressed by Vermeij and Snyder to be retained in Fusinus sensu lato until they could be reclassified. Fusinus aepynotus belongs to Fusininae, a subfamily of Fasciolariidae. F. aepynotus has the common name of "graceful spindle".

== Description ==
Fusinus aepynotus is a relatively small species, with a maximum known shell length of 24 millimetres (0.94 in).

== Ecology ==
Like other fasciolariids, Fusinus aepynotus is a benthic carnivore. Its range includes the Gulf of Mexico, the Florida Keys, and southeastern Florida. It is found at depths between 37 and 366 meters. It is a common species.

== Human significance ==
Fusinus aepynotus is rarely collected by shell collectors, because of its small size.
