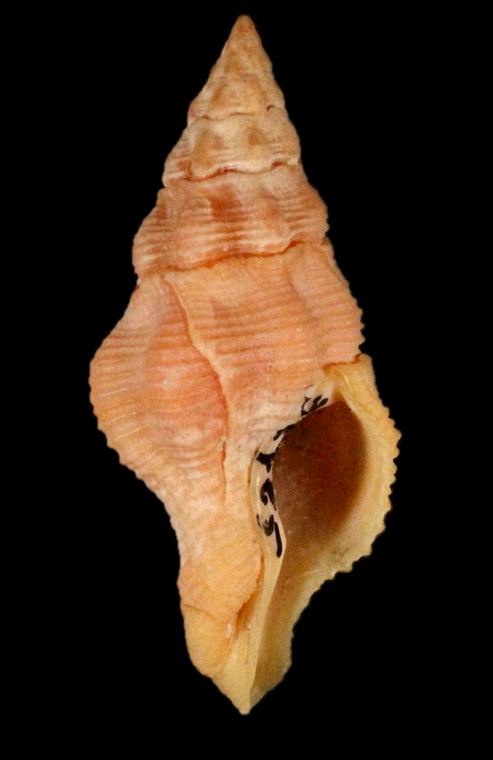
- Shell of Nodopelagia brazieri (specimen at Naturalis Biodiversity Center)

Scientific classification
- Kingdom: Animalia
- Phylum: Mollusca
- Class: Gastropoda
- Subclass: Caenogastropoda
- Order: Neogastropoda
- Family: Fasciolariidae
- Genus: Nodopelagia
- Species: N. brazieri

Binomial name
- Nodopelagia brazieri (Angas, 1877)

Synonyms
- Latirus brazieri (Angas, 1877); Peristernia brazieri Angas, 1877

= Nodopelagia brazieri =

Species of gastropod

Nodopelagia brazieri is a species of sea snail, a marine gastropod mollusk in the family Fasciolariidae, the spindle snails, the tulip snails and their allies.

== Description ==
(Original description) The shell is fusiform, moderately solid, and a light yellowish-brown color. It is longitudinally ribbed with about eight broad ribs that are swollen on the upper part of the shell and become obsolete toward the anterior portion of the body whorl. These ribs are crossed by numerous fine, impressed, concentric lines, which are especially noticeable on the upper whorls.

There are 6.5 whorls, which are slightly flattened below the sutures, and the sutures themselves are irregularly impressed. The aperture is narrowly ovate. The outer lip has a small, blunt tooth on its anterior end. The columella is arcuate with a slight callous projection close to its junction with the outer lip. The siphonal canal is moderate in length and is very slightly exserted and recurved.

== Distribution ==
This marine species is endemic to Australia and occurs off New South Wales.
