= Dentifusus deynzeri =

Scientific classification
- Kingdom: Animalia
- Phylum: Mollusca
- Class: Gastropoda
- Subclass: Caenogastropoda
- Order: Neogastropoda
- Family: Fasciolariidae
- Genus: Dentifusus
- Species: D. deynzeri

Binomial name
- Dentifusus deynzeri Vermeij & Rosenberq, 2003

Species of gastropod

Dentifusus deynzeri is an operculated species of sea snail, a marine gastropod mollusk in the family Fasciolariidae, the spindle snails, the tulip snails and their allies.
