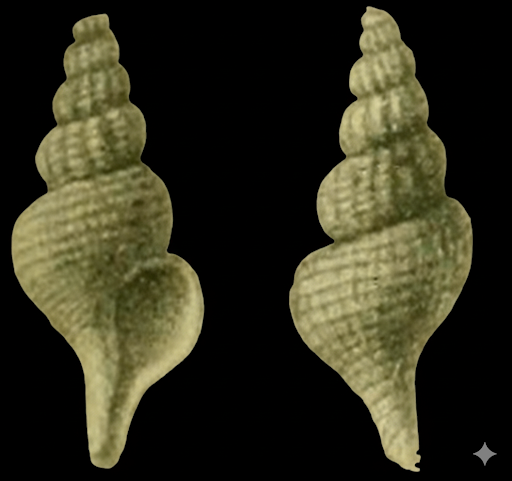
- Shell of Trophonofusus muricatoides (holotype)

Scientific classification
- Kingdom: Animalia
- Phylum: Mollusca
- Class: Gastropoda
- Subclass: Caenogastropoda
- Order: Neogastropoda
- Family: Fasciolariidae
- Genus: Trophonofusus
- Species: T. muricatoides

Binomial name
- Trophonofusus muricatoides (Yokoyama, 1920)

Synonyms
- Trophon muricatoides Yokoyama, 1920

= Trophonofusus muricatoides =

Species of gastropod

Trophonofusus muricatoides is a species of sea snail, a marine gastropod mollusk in the family Muricidae, the murex snails or rock snails.

== Description ==
(Original description) The shell is small, fusiform, and moderately thick. The whorls are very convex and separated by very deep sutures. They are both longitudinally ribbed and spirally striated. The ribs are rounded and strong on the upper whorls, becoming almost obsolete on the body whorl. They are separated by intervals of less breadth, numbering about thirteen on the penultimate whorl.

The spiral striae or threads are equal and distant, with five on all whorls except the body whorl. The body whorl has more than seven additional, though somewhat finer, threads on its base. There are also one or a few very fine interstitial lines between these threads.

The aperture is inverted flask-shaped with a short, somewhat bent canal. The inner lip is smooth, and the outer lip is thickened and smooth on the inside.

== Distribution ==
This marine species occurs off Japan.
