= Harasewychia harasewychi =

Scientific classification
- Kingdom: Animalia
- Phylum: Mollusca
- Class: Gastropoda
- Subclass: Caenogastropoda
- Order: Neogastropoda
- Family: Fasciolariidae
- Genus: Harasewychia
- Species: H. harasewychi

Binomial name
- Harasewychia harasewychi Petuch, 1987

Species of gastropod

Harasewychia harasewychi is a species of sea snail, a marine gastropod mollusk in the family Fasciolariidae, the spindle snails, the tulip snails and their allies.

== Description ==
Original description: "General shell form and color for genus; shoulder and spire whorls sharply-angled, giving shell tabulate appearance; periphery of shoulder with one strong, carina-like cord; 15-17 thin, evenly-spaced axial ribs per whorl; ribs overlaid by 10 large spiral cords; large, knoblike bead produced at intersection of axial and spiral cords; fine spiral threads between large spiral cords and on siphonal canal; sloping area between shoulder cord and suture without coarse sculpture."

== Distribution ==
Locus typicus: "Near Los Monges Island, mouth of the Gulf of Venezuela, Venezuela."
