= Callifusus irregularis =

Scientific classification
- Kingdom: Animalia
- Phylum: Mollusca
- Class: Gastropoda
- Subclass: Caenogastropoda
- Order: Neogastropoda
- Family: Fasciolariidae
- Genus: Callifusus
- Species: C. irregularis

Binomial name
- Callifusus irregularis (Grabau, 1904)

Synonyms
- Fusinus irregularis (Grabau, 1904); Fusinus dupetitthouarsi var. irregularis Grabau, 1904; Fusus irregularis (Grabau, 1904)

Species of gastropod

Callifusus irregularis is a species of sea snail, a marine gastropod mollusk in the family Fasciolariidae, the spindle snails, the tulip snails and their allies.

== Distribution ==
This marine species occurs in the Gulf of California.
