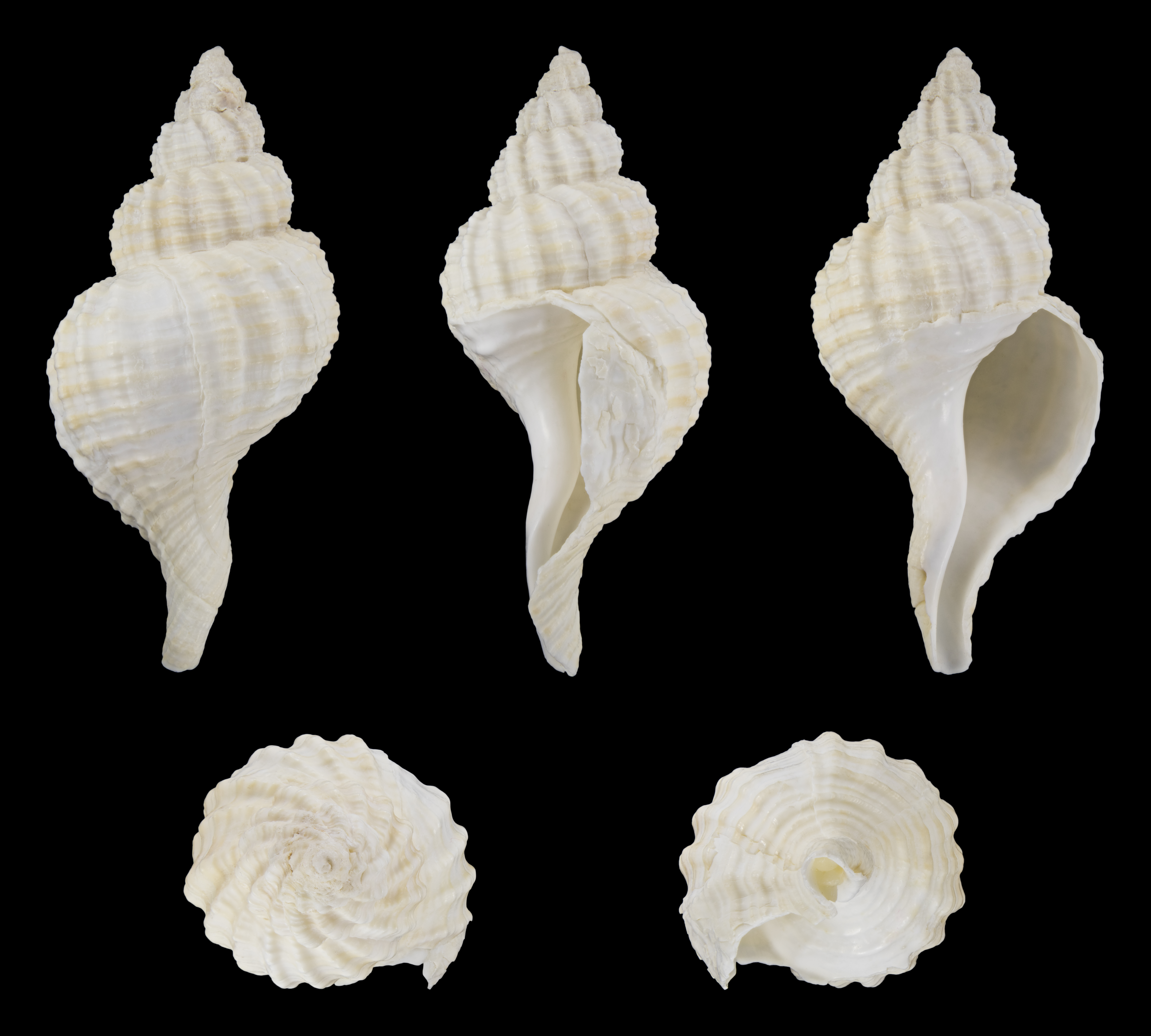
- Shell of Glaphyrina caudata

Scientific classification
- Kingdom: Animalia
- Phylum: Mollusca
- Class: Gastropoda
- Subclass: Caenogastropoda
- Order: Neogastropoda
- Family: Fasciolariidae
- Genus: Glaphyrina
- Species: G. caudata

Binomial name
- Glaphyrina caudata (Quoy & Gaimard, 1833)

Synonyms
- Fusus caudatus Quoy & Gaimard, 1833 (original combination); Fusus vulpicolor Sowerby, 1880; † Glaphyrina progenitor Finlay, 1926; Glaphyrina vulpicolor (G. B. Sowerby II, 1880); † Glaphyrina vulpicolor annectens Powell, 1934; † Glaphyrina vulpicolor progenitor Finlay, 1926; Siphonalia caudata Suter, 1913; Glaphyrina vulpicolor Finlay, 1927

= Glaphyrina caudata =

Species of gastropod

Glaphyrina caudata is a species of large sea snail, a marine gastropod mollusc in the family Fasciolariidae.

== Distribution ==
This species is endemic to New Zealand.

== Habitat ==
This sea snail is found in shallow water to depths of about 110 m.

== Shell description ==
Shell rather small, elongated fusiform, solid, with a moderately long canal. Sculpture consisting of subequal narrow spiral cords, about 10 on the penultimate whorl, the interspaces shallow, much broader than the cords upon the base, where they have a fine spiral thread; axial sculpture formed by numerous vertical broadly rounded ribs, 15 to 20 on the body whorl, where they become obsolete below the periphery. Colour light - yellowish, the spirals reddish - brown. Spire elevated conic, of the same height as the aperture with canal; outlines straight. Protoconch of 2 smooth whorls, small and globose. Whorls 8, regularly increasing, convex, very lightly shouldered, the last somewhat inflated; base excavated. Suture not much impressed. Aperture large, oval, broadly angled above, produced below into a fairly long oblique and open canal, rounded at the base. Outer lip convex, sharp, lightly lirate inside. Columella subvertical, slightly concave. Inner lip narrow, spreading over the parietal wall, narrowed below, and forming the inner edge of the canal. Operculum unknown.

The shell height is up to 49.5 mm, and width up to 21 mm.
