= Ollaphon molorthus =

Scientific classification
- Kingdom: Animalia
- Phylum: Mollusca
- Class: Gastropoda
- Subclass: Caenogastropoda
- Order: Neogastropoda
- Family: Fasciolariidae
- Genus: Ollaphon
- Species: O. molorthus

Binomial name
- Ollaphon molorthus (Hedley & May 1908)

Synonyms
- Trophon molorthus Hedley & May 1908

Species of gastropod

Ollaphon molorthus is a species of sea snail, a marine gastropod mollusk in the family Muricidae, the murex snails or rock snails.
