= Glaphyrina plicata =

Scientific classification
- Kingdom: Animalia
- Phylum: Mollusca
- Class: Gastropoda
- Subclass: Caenogastropoda
- Order: Neogastropoda
- Family: Fasciolariidae
- Genus: Glaphyrina
- Species: G. plicata

Binomial name
- Glaphyrina plicata Powell, 1929

Synonyms
- †Glaphyrina marwicki Beu, 1965

Species of gastropod

Glaphyrina plicata is a species of large sea snail, a marine gastropod mollusc in the family Fasciolariidae.

== Distribution ==
This species is endemic to the northern part of the North Island of New Zealand. It is found in waters of about 80 m.

The shell height is up to 44.5 mm, and width up to 19.5 mm.
