= Saginafusus pricei =

Scientific classification
- Kingdom: Animalia
- Phylum: Mollusca
- Class: Gastropoda
- Subclass: Caenogastropoda
- Order: Neogastropoda
- Family: Fasciolariidae
- Genus: Saginafusus
- Species: S. pricei

Binomial name
- Saginafusus pricei (E.A. Smith, 1887)

Synonyms
- Fusus pricei E.A. Smith, 1887

Species of gastropod

Saginafusus pricei is a species of sea snail, a marine gastropod mollusk in the family Fasciolariidae, the spindle snails, the tulip snails and their allies.

== Description ==
This operculated species attains a size of 210 mm.

== Distribution ==
Australia.
