= Fractolatirus normalis =

Scientific classification
- Kingdom: Animalia
- Phylum: Mollusca
- Class: Gastropoda
- Subclass: Caenogastropoda
- Order: Neogastropoda
- Family: Fasciolariidae
- Genus: Fractolatirus
- Species: F. normalis

Binomial name
- Fractolatirus normalis Iredale, 1936

Species of gastropod

Fractolatirus normalis is a species of sea snail, a marine gastropod mollusk in the family Fasciolariidae, the spindle snails, the tulip snails and their allies.
