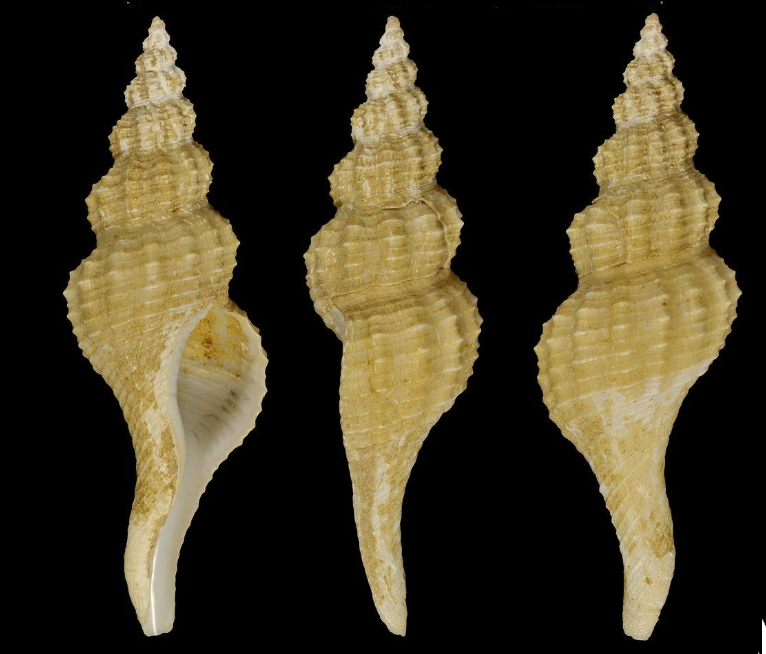
- Shell of Araiofusus colpoicus (holotype at the Smithsonian Institution)

Scientific classification
- Kingdom: Animalia
- Phylum: Mollusca
- Class: Gastropoda
- Subclass: Caenogastropoda
- Order: Neogastropoda
- Family: Fasciolariidae
- Genus: Araiofusus
- Species: A. colpoicus

Binomial name
- Araiofusus colpoicus (Dall, 1915)

Synonyms
- Fusinus colpoicus Dall, 1915 (original combination)

= Araiofusus colpoicus =

Species of gastropod

Araiofusus colpoicus is a species of sea snail, a marine gastropod mollusk in the family Fasciolariidae, the spindle snails, the tulip snails and their allies.

== Description ==
(Original description) This species resembles Barbarofusus barbarensis (Trask, 1855) when the latter reaches approximately 60 mm in length.

It is distinguishable from B. barbarensis by the following features:

Axial Ribs: It possesses 13 axial ribs (versus 11 in B. barbarensis). These ribs are narrower and separated by wider interspaces.

Spiral Sculpture: The revolving threads are notably sharper and exhibit a more conspicuous alternation in size.

Whorl Sculpture: On the penultimate whorl, there are 6 major and 6 minor spiral threads that cross the axial ribs without forming nodules.

At a total length of 66 mm (excluding the eroded nucleus), the shell has 8 whorls. The aperture and siphonal canal measure a combined 36 mm. The siphonal canal itself is conspicuously tortuous (twisted).

== Distribution ==
This marine species occurs in the Gulf of California
