= Araiofusus eueides =

Scientific classification
- Kingdom: Animalia
- Phylum: Mollusca
- Class: Gastropoda
- Subclass: Caenogastropoda
- Order: Neogastropoda
- Family: Fasciolariidae
- Genus: Araiofusus
- Species: A. eueides

Binomial name
- Araiofusus eueides P. Callomon & M. A. Snyder, 2017

Species of gastropod

Araiofusus eueides is a species of sea snail, a marine gastropod mollusk in the family Fasciolariidae, the spindle snails, the tulip snails and their allies.

== Distribution ==
This marine species occurs off the Baja California.
