= Dentifusus =

Scientific classification
- Kingdom: Animalia
- Phylum: Mollusca
- Class: Gastropoda
- Subclass: Caenogastropoda
- Order: Neogastropoda
- Family: Fasciolariidae
- Genus: Dentifusus; Vermeij & Rosenberg, 2003

Genus of gastropods

Dentifusus is a genus of sea snails, marine gastropod mollusks in the family Fasciolariidae, the spindle snails, the tulip snails and their allies.

== Species ==
Species within the genus Dentifusus include:

- Dentifusus deynzeri Vermeij & Rosenberq, 2003
