= Saginafusus =

Scientific classification
- Kingdom: Animalia
- Phylum: Mollusca
- Class: Gastropoda
- Subclass: Caenogastropoda
- Order: Neogastropoda
- Family: Fasciolariidae
- Genus: Saginafusus; Iredale, 1931

Genus of gastropods

Saginafusus is a genus of sea snails, marine gastropod mollusks in the family Fasciolariidae, the spindle snails, the tulip snails and their allies.

== Species ==
Species within the genus Saginafusus include:

- Saginafusus pricei (E.A. Smith, 1887)
