= Trophonofusus =

Scientific classification
- Kingdom: Animalia
- Phylum: Mollusca
- Class: Gastropoda
- Subclass: Caenogastropoda
- Order: Neogastropoda
- Family: Fasciolariidae
- Subfamily: Fusininae
- Genus: Trophonofusus; Kuroda & Habe, 1971

Type species
- Trophon muricatoides Yokoyama, 1920

Genus of gastropods

Trophonofusus is a genus of sea snails, marine gastropod mollusks in the family Fasciolariidae, the spindle snails, the tulip snails and their allies.

== Species ==
Species within the genus Trophonofusus include:

- Trophonofusus muricatoides (Yokoyama, 1920)
