= Fractolatirus =

Scientific classification
- Kingdom: Animalia
- Phylum: Mollusca
- Class: Gastropoda
- Subclass: Caenogastropoda
- Order: Neogastropoda
- Family: Fasciolariidae
- Genus: Fractolatirus; Iredale, 1936

Type species
- Fractolatirus normalis, Iredale, 1936

Genus of gastropods

Fractolatirus is a genus of sea snails, marine gastropod mollusks in the family Fasciolariidae, the spindle snails, the tulip snails and their allies.

== Species ==
Species within the genus Fractolatirus include:

- Fractolatirus normalis Iredale, 1936
