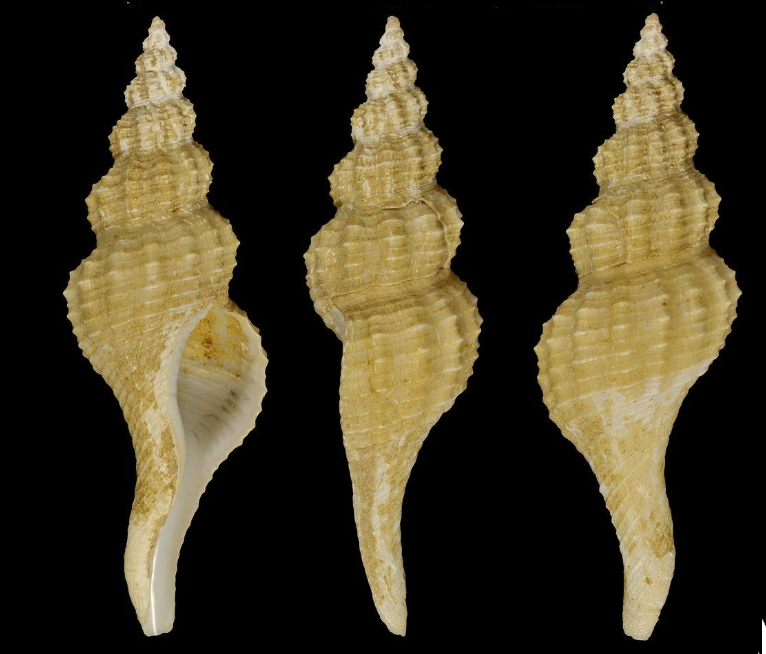
- Shell of Araiofusus colpoicus (holotype at the Smithsonian Institution)

Scientific classification
- Kingdom: Animalia
- Phylum: Mollusca
- Class: Gastropoda
- Subclass: Caenogastropoda
- Order: Neogastropoda
- Family: Fasciolariidae
- Subfamily: Fusininae
- Genus: Araiofusus; Callomon & Snyder, 2017

Type species
- Araiofusus araios Callomon & Snyder, 2017

= Araiofusus =

Genus of gastropods

Araiofusus is a genus of sea snails, marine gastropod mollusks in the family Fasciolariidae, the spindle snails, the tulip snails and their allies.

== Distribution ==
Species of this genus occurs off the Pacific coast of the US and Mexico.

== Species ==
Species within the genus Araiofusus include:

- Araiofusus araios Callomon & Snyder, 2017
- Araiofusus colpoicus (Dall, 1915)
- Araiofusus eueides Callomon & Snyder, 2017
