= Callifusus =

Scientific classification
- Kingdom: Animalia
- Phylum: Mollusca
- Class: Gastropoda
- Subclass: Caenogastropoda
- Order: Neogastropoda
- Superfamily: Buccinoidea
- Family: Fasciolariidae
- Genus: Callifusus; Vermeij & Snyder, 2018

Type species
- Fusus irregularis Grabau, 1904

Genus of gastropods

Callifusus is a genus of sea snails, marine gastropod mollusks in the subfamily Fusininae of the family Fasciolariidae, the spindle snails, the tulip snails and their allies.

== Species ==
Species within the genus Callifusus include:

- Callifusus edjanssi (Callomon & Snyder, 2017)
- Callifusus irregularis (Grabau, 1904)
