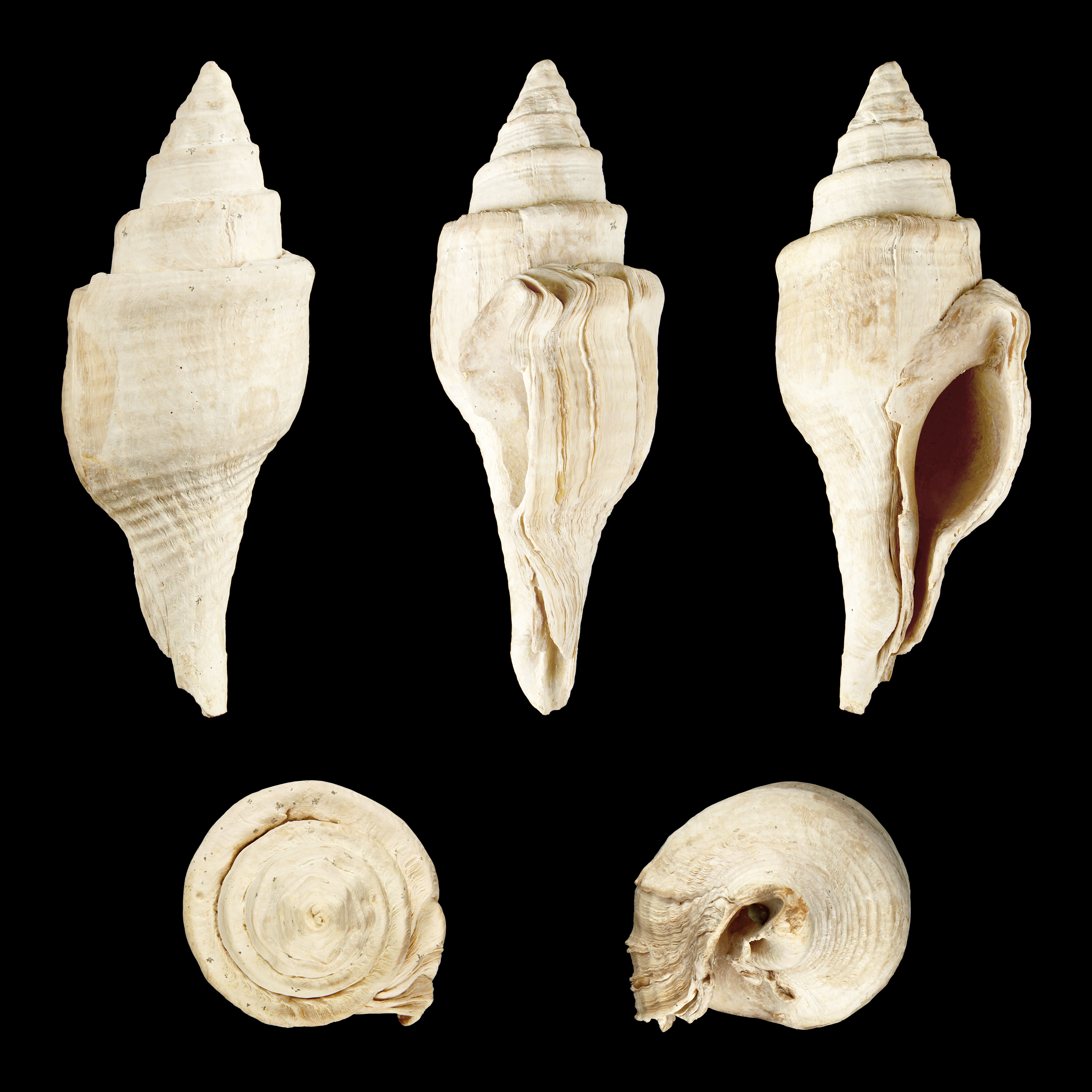
- Clavilithes noae (Lamarck, 1803)

Scientific classification
- Kingdom: Animalia
- Phylum: Mollusca
- Class: Gastropoda
- Subclass: Caenogastropoda
- Order: Neogastropoda
- Family: Fasciolariidae
- Genus: †Clavilithes; Swainson, 1840

Type species
- Fusus noae, Lamarck, 1803

= Clavilithes =

Clavilithes Temporal range: Paleocene - Pliocene

Extinct genus of gastropods

Clavilithes is an extinct genus of fossil sea snails, marine gastropod mollusks in the family Fasciolariidae, the tulip snails and spindle snails.

This genus lived from the Paleocene to Pliocene, in Africa, Asia, Europe, North America, and South America.
