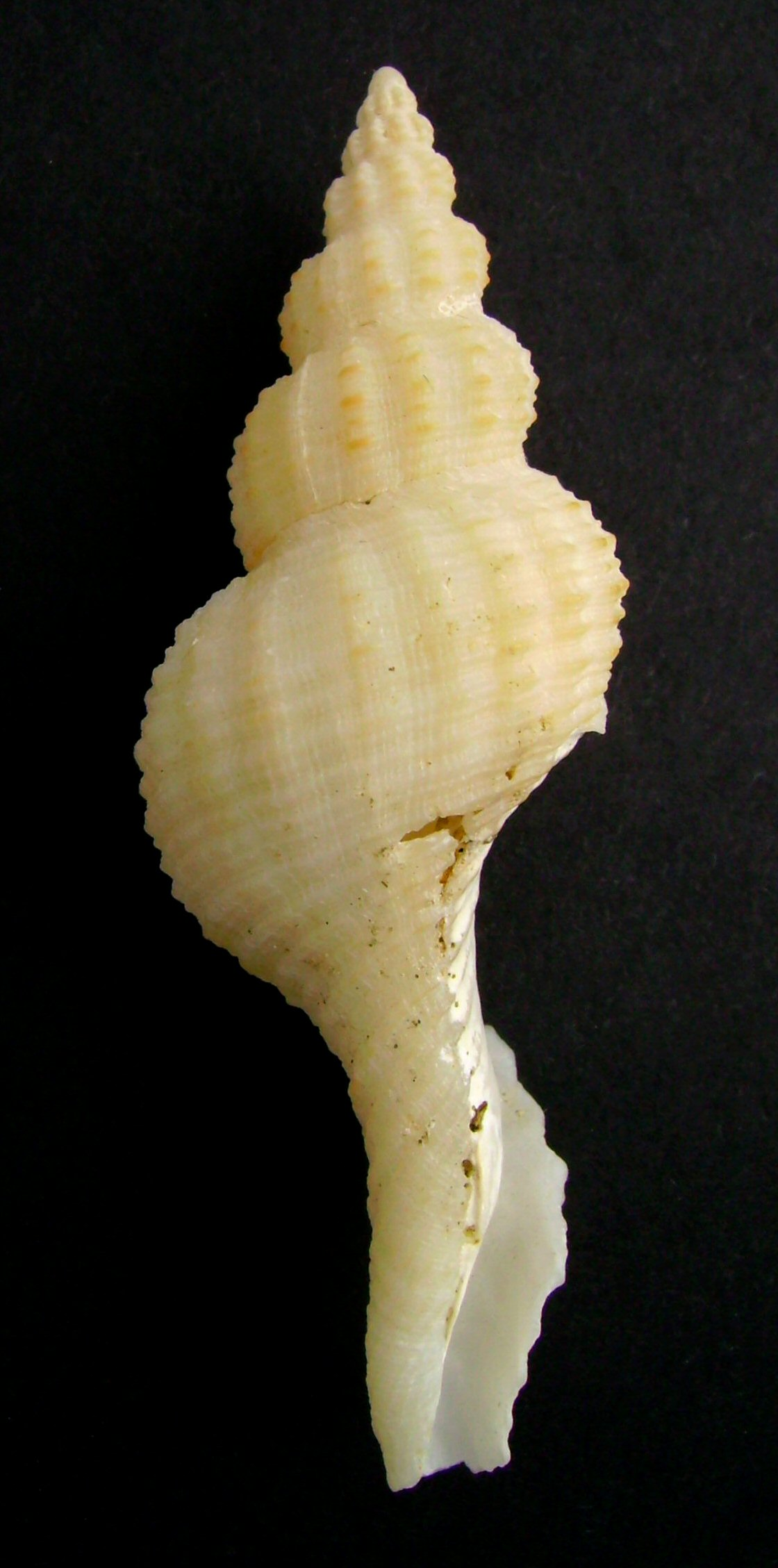
- Glaphyrina caudata

Scientific classification
- Kingdom: Animalia
- Phylum: Mollusca
- Class: Gastropoda
- Subclass: Caenogastropoda
- Order: Neogastropoda
- Superfamily: Buccinoidea
- Family: Fasciolariidae
- Genus: Glaphyrina; Finlay, 1927

Type species
- Fusus vulpicolor G.B. Sowerby II, 1880

= Glaphyrina =

Glaphyrina Temporal range: Miocene to Recent

Genus of molluscs

Glaphyrina is a genus of large sea snails, marine gastropod mollusc in the family Fasciolariidae.

== Species ==
Species in the genus Glaphyrina include:

- Glaphyrina caudata (Quoy & Gaimard, 1833)
- † Glaphyrina excelsa (Suter, 1917)
- † Glaphyrina paucispiralis Beu, 1967
- Glaphyrina plicata Powell, 1929)

Species brought into synonymy

- Glaphyrina marwicki Beu, 1965 † : synonym of Glaphyrina plicata Powell, 1929
- Glaphyrina progenitor Finlay, 1926 † : synonym of Glaphyrina caudata (Quoy & Gaimard, 1833)
- Glaphyrina vulpicolor (G. B. Sowerby II, 1880) : synonym of Glaphyrina caudata (Quoy & Gaimard, 1833)
