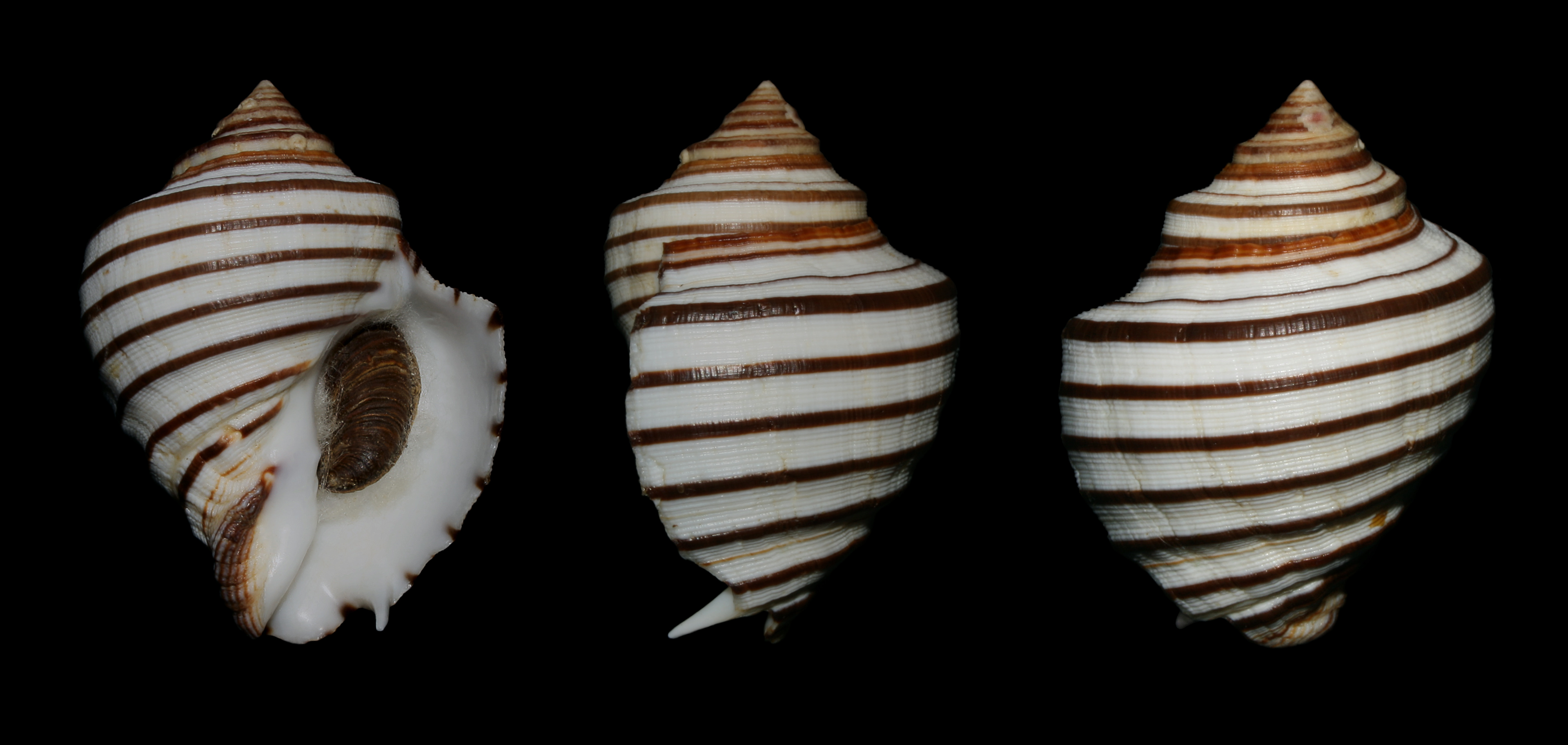
- A shell of Opeatostoma pseudodon.

Scientific classification
- Kingdom: Animalia
- Phylum: Mollusca
- Class: Gastropoda
- Subclass: Caenogastropoda
- Order: Neogastropoda
- Family: Fasciolariidae
- Genus: Opeatostoma; Berry, 1958

= Opeatostoma =

Genus of gastropods

Opeatostoma is a genus of sea snails, marine gastropod mollusks in the family Fasciolariidae, the spindle snails, the tulip snails and their allies.

== Species ==
Species within the genus Opeatostoma include:

- Opeatostoma pseudodon (Burrow, 1815)
