= Ollaphon =

Scientific classification
- Kingdom: Animalia
- Phylum: Mollusca
- Class: Gastropoda
- Subclass: Caenogastropoda
- Order: Neogastropoda
- Family: Fasciolariidae
- Subfamily: Fusininae
- Genus: Ollaphon; Iredale, 1929

Type species
- Trophon molorthus Hedley & May, 1908

Genus of gastropods

Ollaphon is a genus of sea snails, marine gastropod mollusks in the family Fasciolariidae, the spindle snails, the tulip snails and their allies.

The family allocation of Ollaphon is uncertain; this genus is sometimes placed in the family Muricidae.

== Species ==
Species within the genus Ollaphon include:

- Ollaphon molorthus (Hedley & May, 1908)
