= Nodopelagia =

Scientific classification
- Kingdom: Animalia
- Phylum: Mollusca
- Class: Gastropoda
- Subclass: Caenogastropoda
- Order: Neogastropoda
- Family: Fasciolariidae
- Genus: Nodopelagia; Hedley, 1915

Type species
- Peristernia brazieri Angas, 1877

Genus of gastropods

Nodopelagia is a genus of sea snails, marine gastropod mollusks in the family Fasciolariidae, the spindle snails, the tulip snails and their allies.

== General characteristics ==
(Original description) The shell is remarkably solid and fusiform in shape, tapering elegantly at both ends. It features a short siphonal canal and is structurally reinforced by prominent longitudinal ribs.

== Species ==
Species within the genus Nodopelagia include:

- Nodopelagia brazieri (Angas, 1877)
