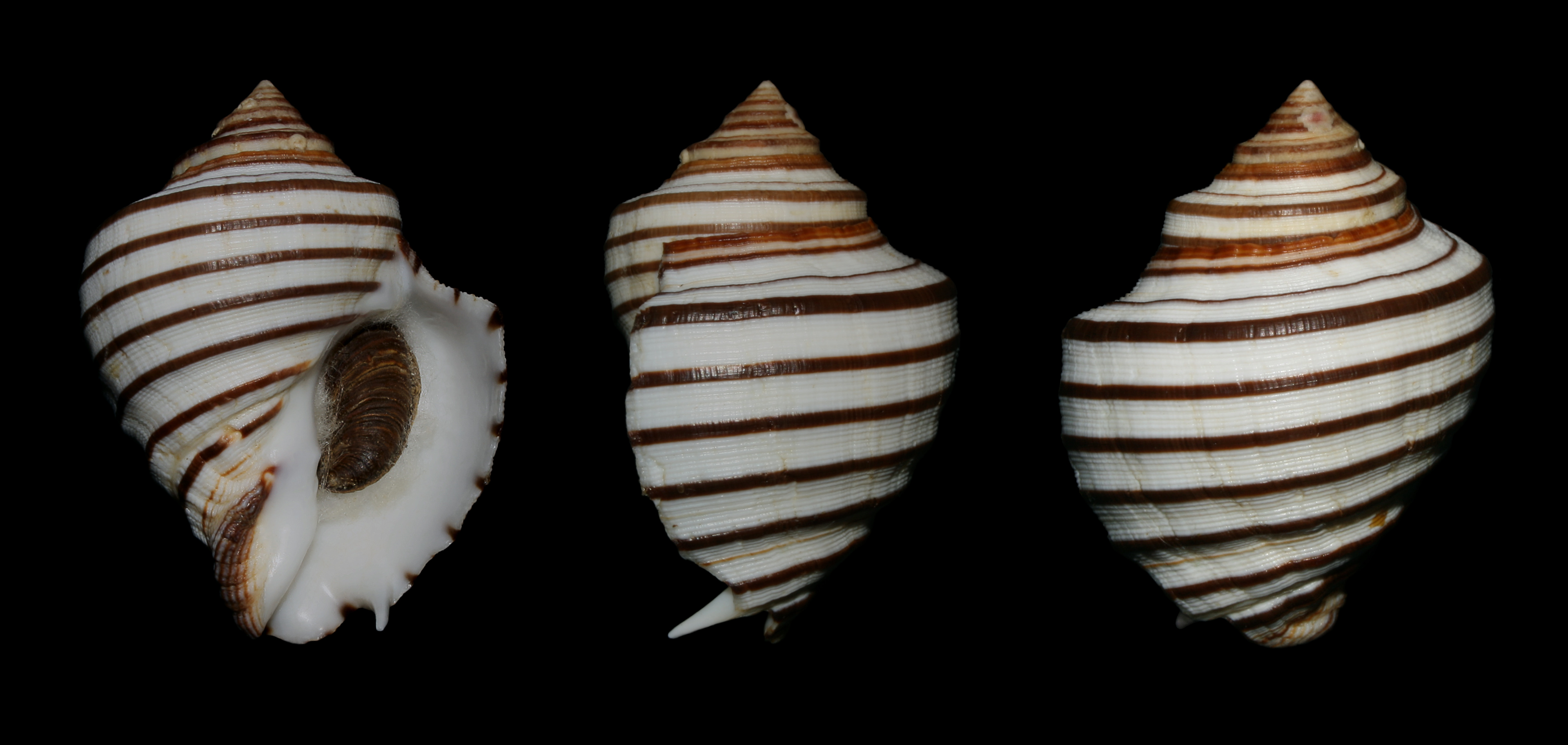
- A shell of Opeatostoma pseudodon.

Scientific classification
- Kingdom: Animalia
- Phylum: Mollusca
- Class: Gastropoda
- Subclass: Caenogastropoda
- Order: Neogastropoda
- Family: Fasciolariidae
- Genus: Opeatostoma
- Species: O. pseudodon

Binomial name
- Opeatostoma pseudodon (Burrow, 1815)

Synonyms
- Buccinum pseudodon Burrow, 1815; Monoceros cingulatum Lamarck, 1816

= Opeatostoma pseudodon =

Species of gastropod

Opeatostoma pseudodon, common name the thorn latirus or banded tooth latirus or red footed conch, is a species of predatory sea snail, a marine gastropod mollusk in the family Fasciolariidae, the tulip snails and spindle snails.

== Distribution ==
This species is found on the tropical west coast of North America: in Southern Baja California, from Mexico to Peru, and in the Galápagos.

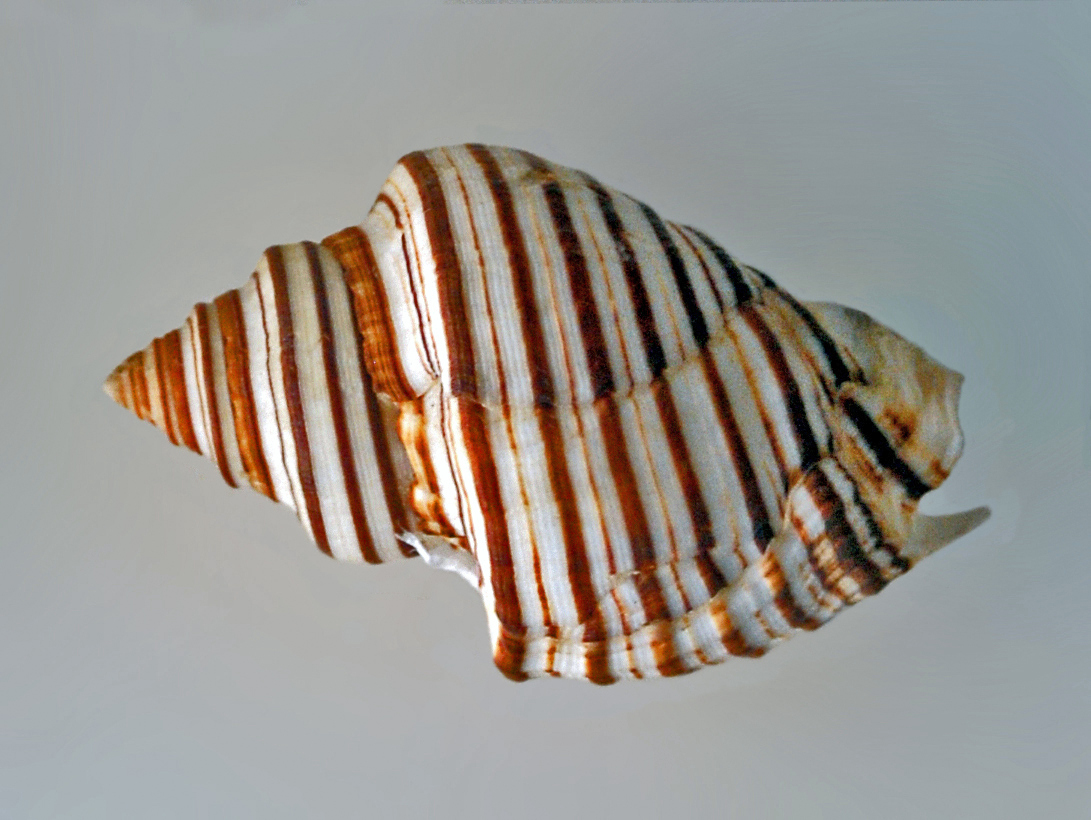
A shell of Opeatostoma pseudodon

== Description ==
Shells of Opeatostoma pseudodon can reach a length of about 29–75 millimetres (1.1–3.0 in). The shells are white or brown with thin brown or black stripes. The body of the snail is reddish. This species has the longest apertural tooth developed by any gastropod. By means of this long spine or thorn (hence the common name) which grows from the tip of the snail's aperture, they anchor themselves in the sandy and coral rubble substrate.

== Behavior ==
These snails live under rocks, usually partially buried in coral sand. They are active nocturnally. They mainly feed on small worms and on other gastropods.
