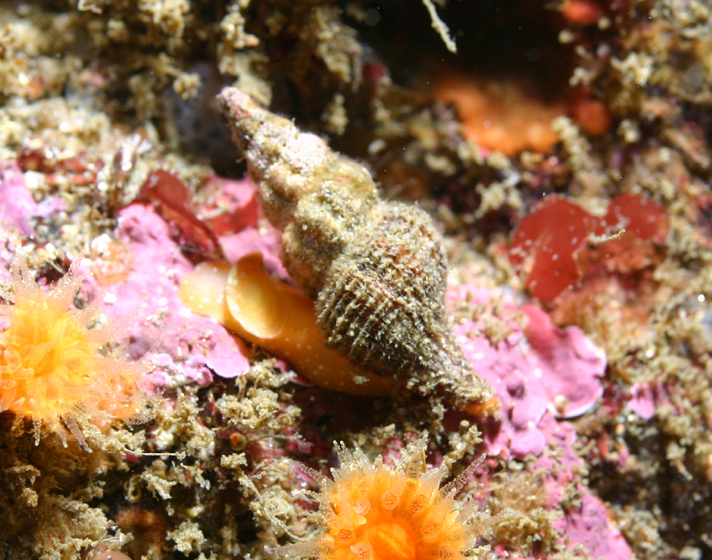
- A live image of Fusinus monksae

Scientific classification
- Kingdom: Animalia
- Phylum: Mollusca
- Class: Gastropoda
- Subclass: Caenogastropoda
- Order: Neogastropoda
- Superfamily: Buccinoidea
- Family: Fasciolariidae; Gray, 1853

Type genus
- Fasciolaria Lamarck, 1799

= Fasciolariidae =

Family of gastropods

Fasciolariidae is a family of small to large sea snails, marine gastropod mollusks in the superfamily Buccinoidea. Species in Fasciolariidae are commonly known as tulip snails and spindle snails.

The family Fasciolariidae most likely appeared about 110 million years ago during the Cretaceous period.

== Distribution ==
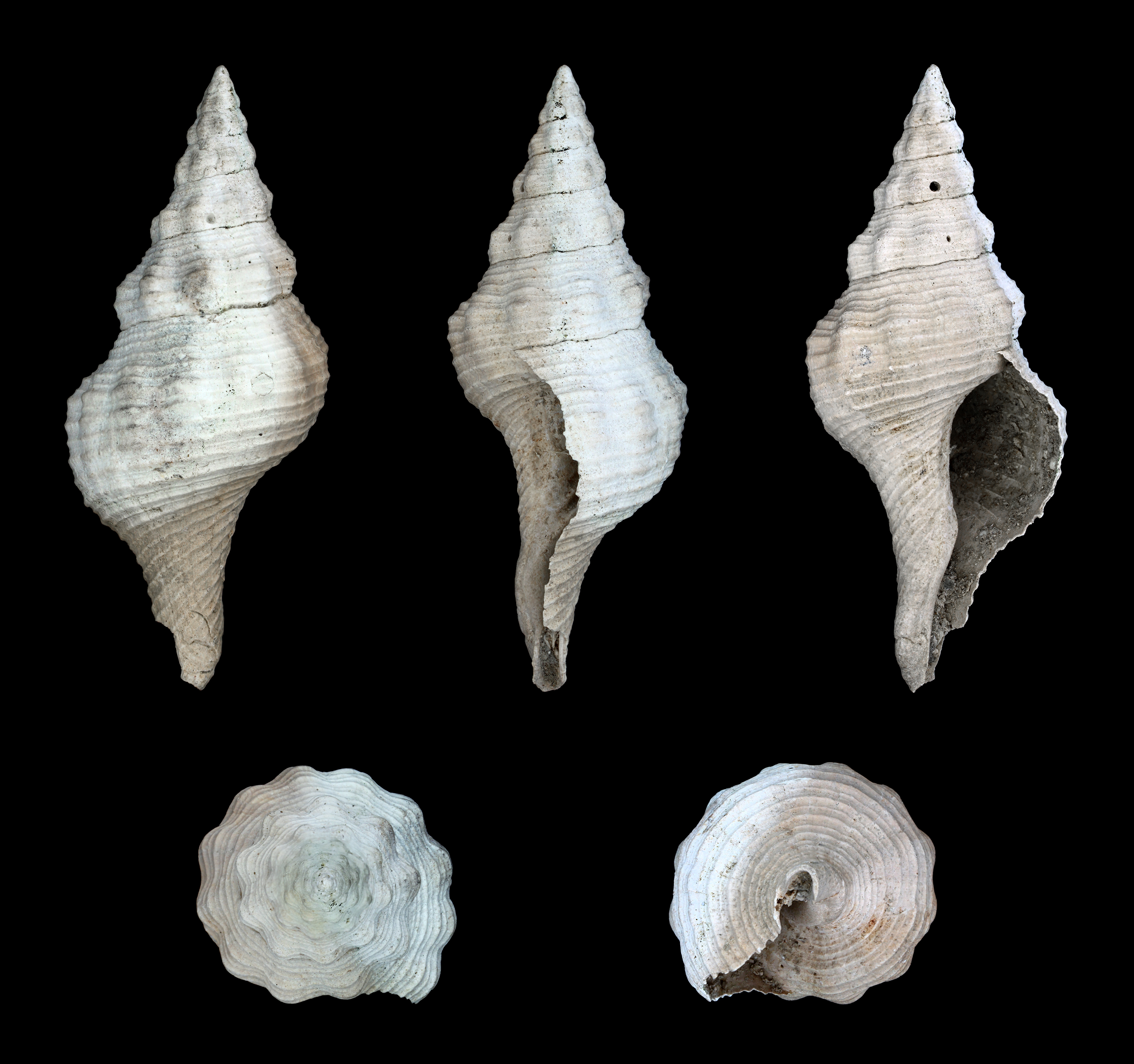
Fasciolaria scalarina

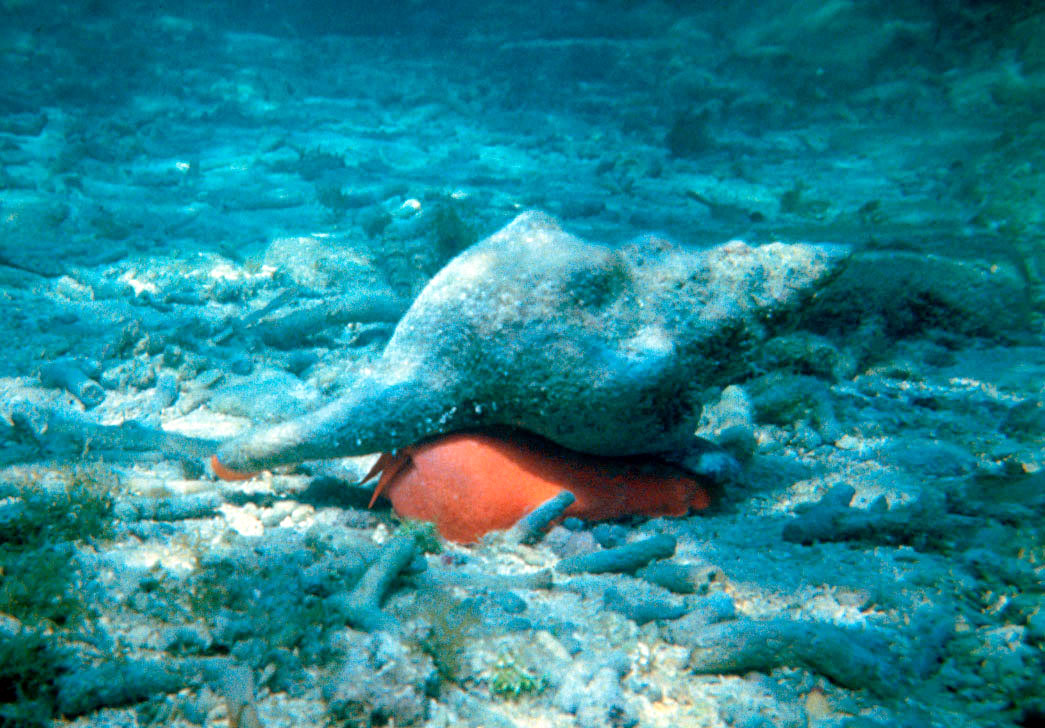
Pleuroploca gigantea

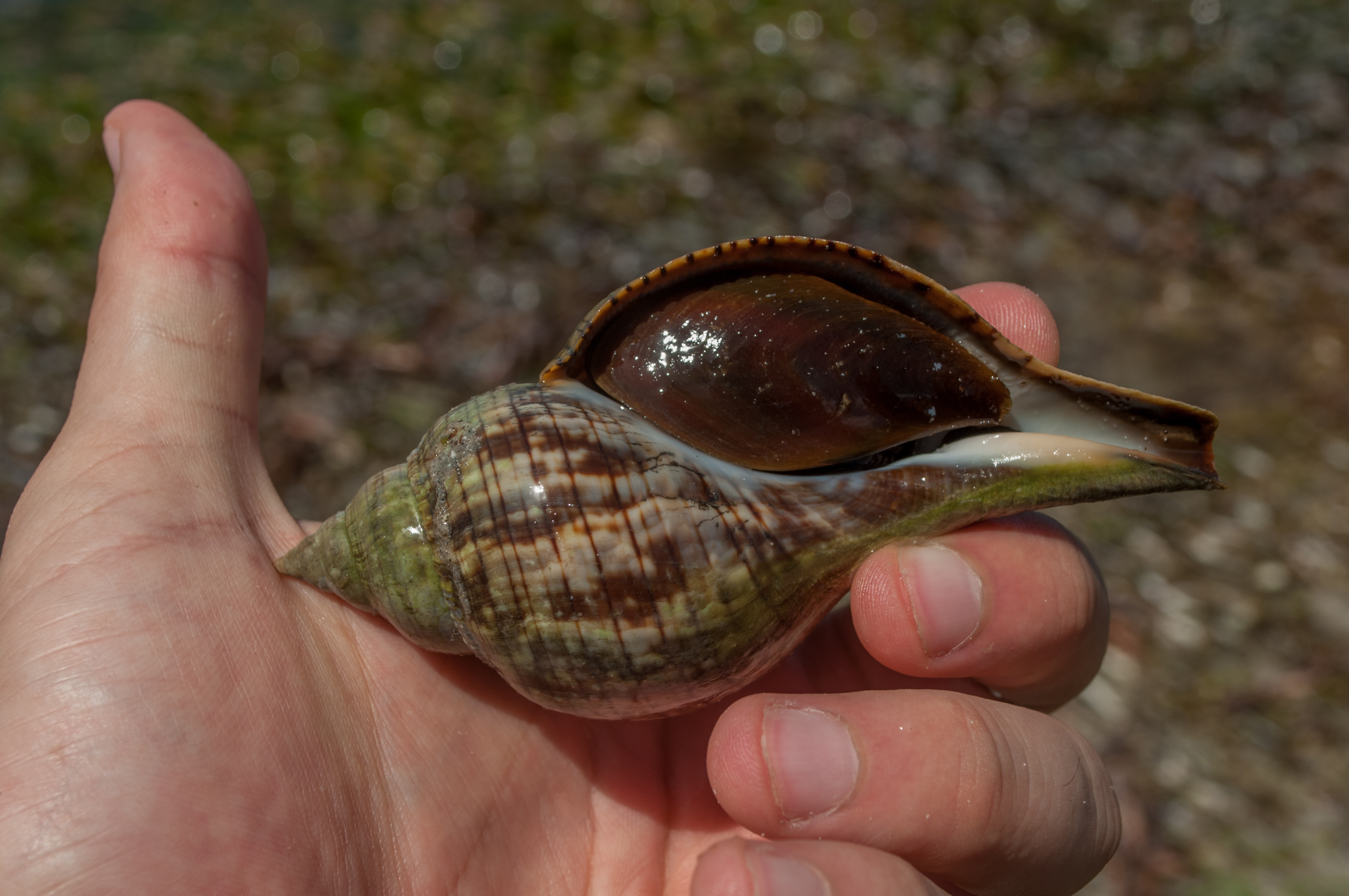
Fasciolaria tulipa

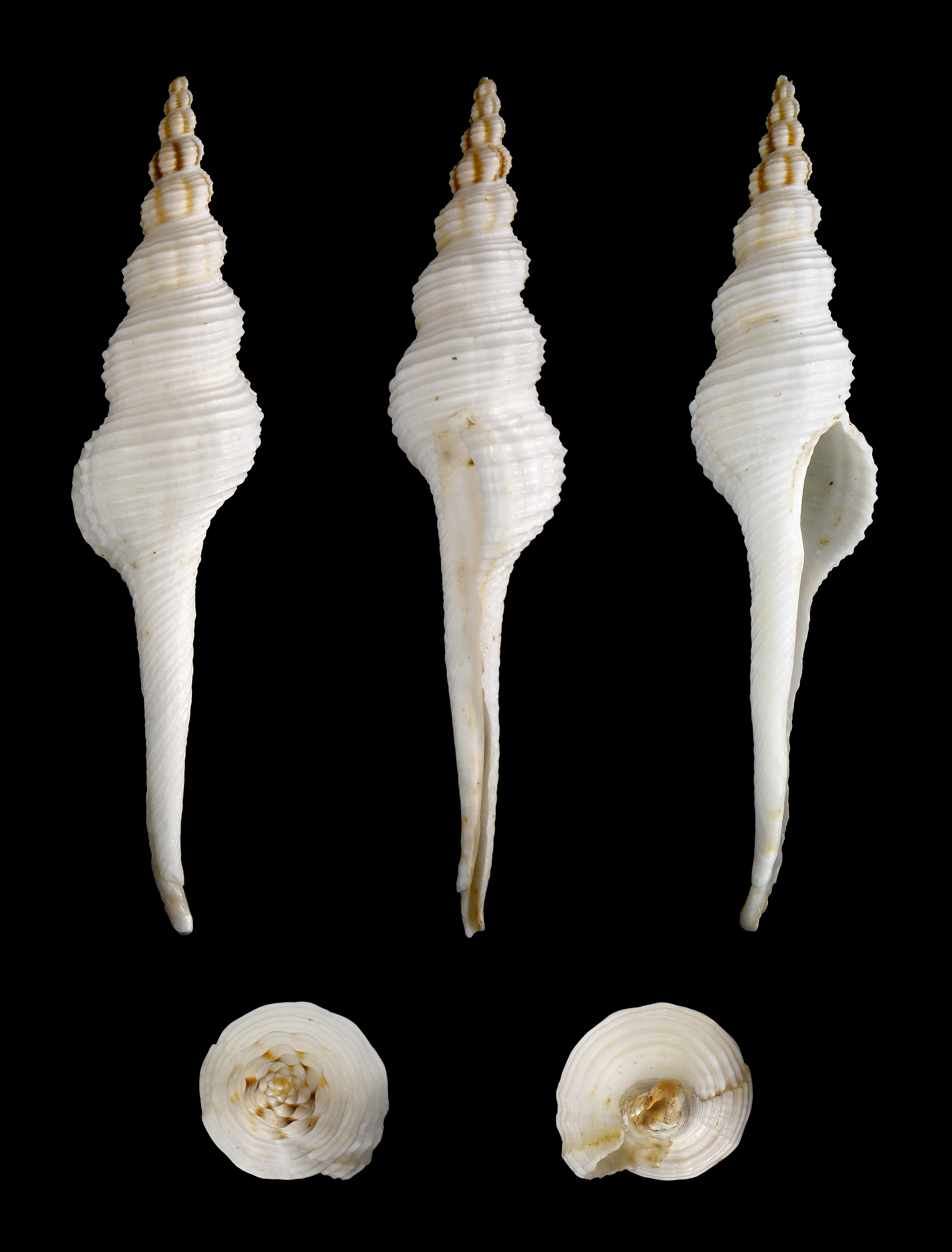
Fusinus colus

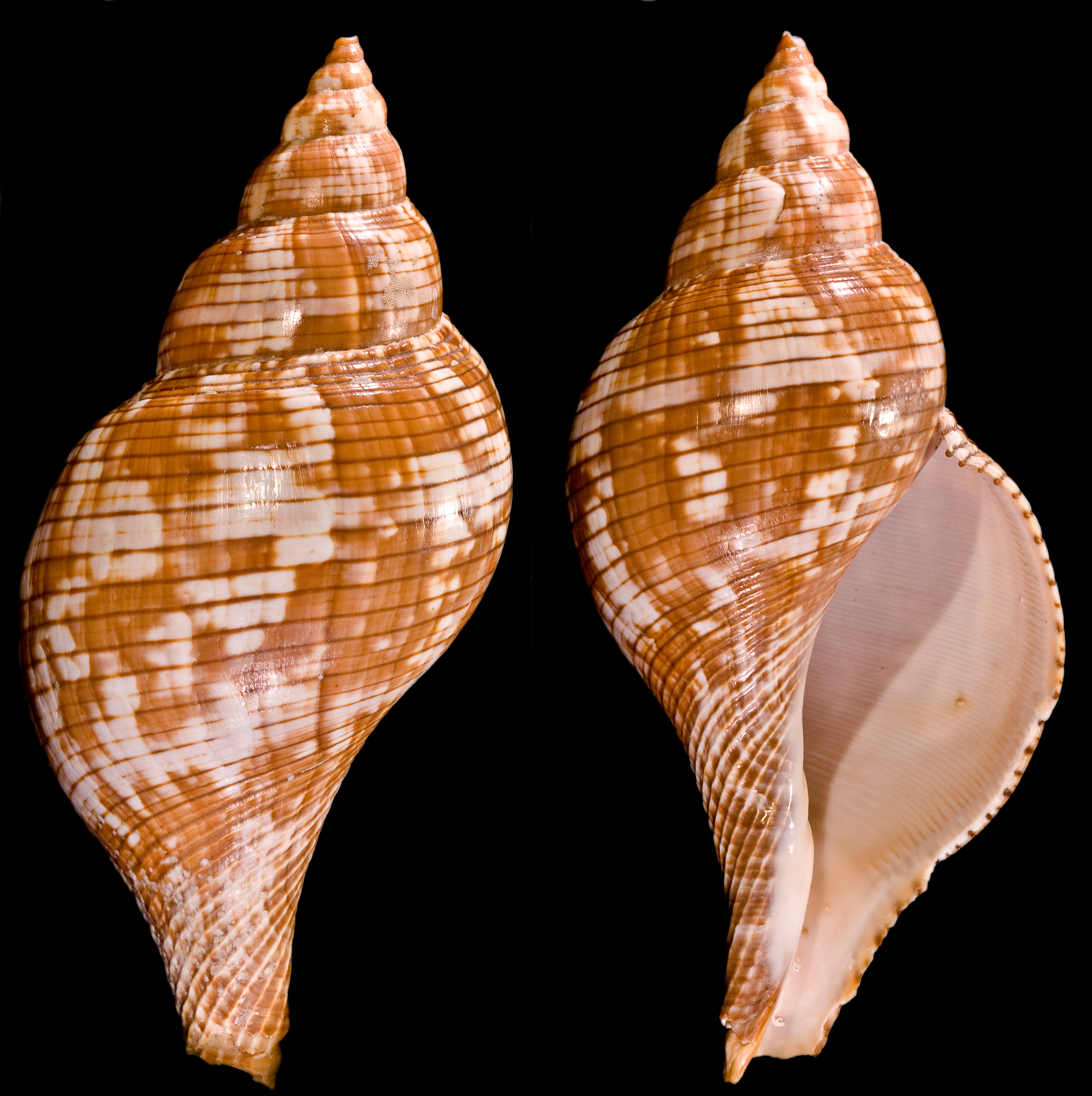
Fasciolaria tulipa

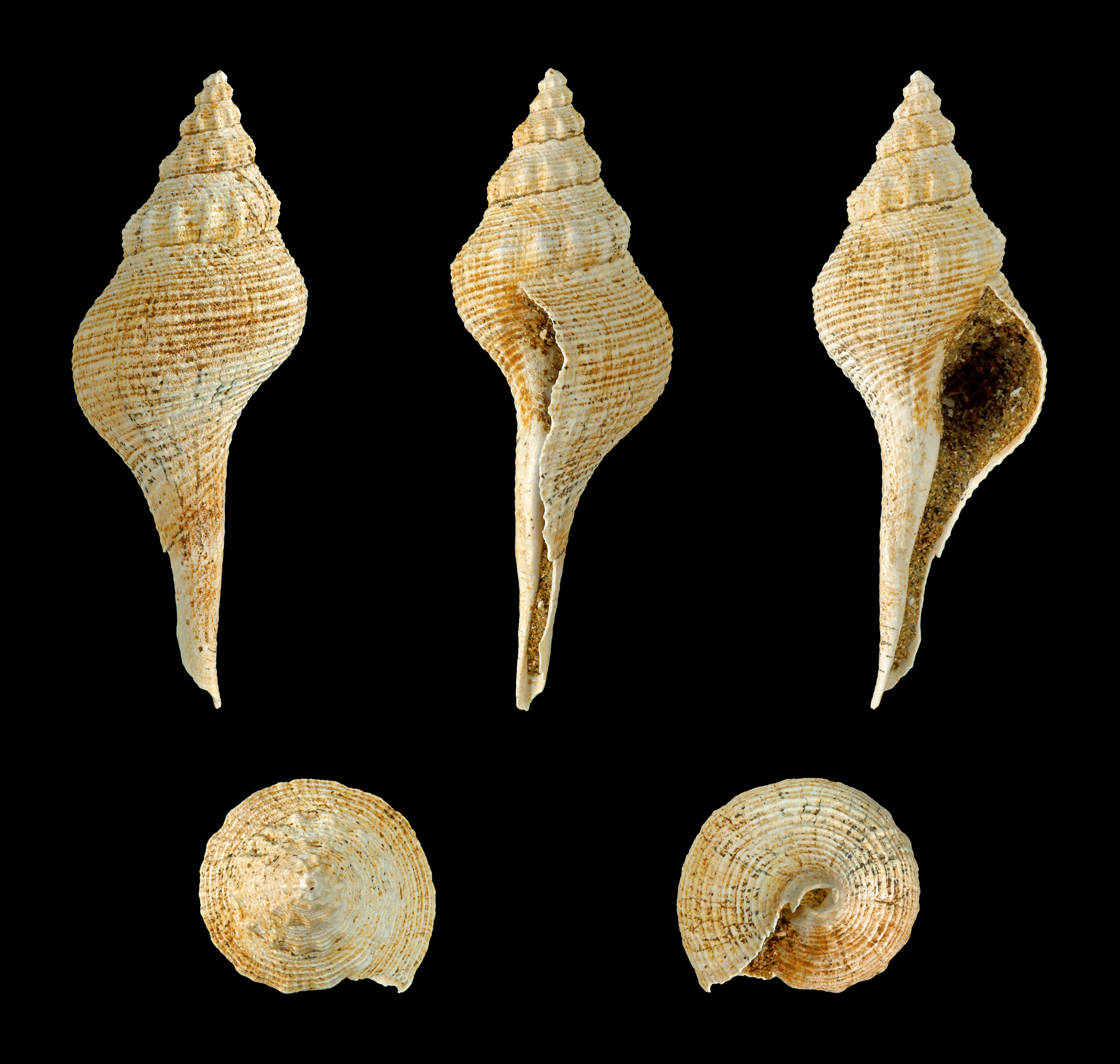
Euthriofusus peyrerensis

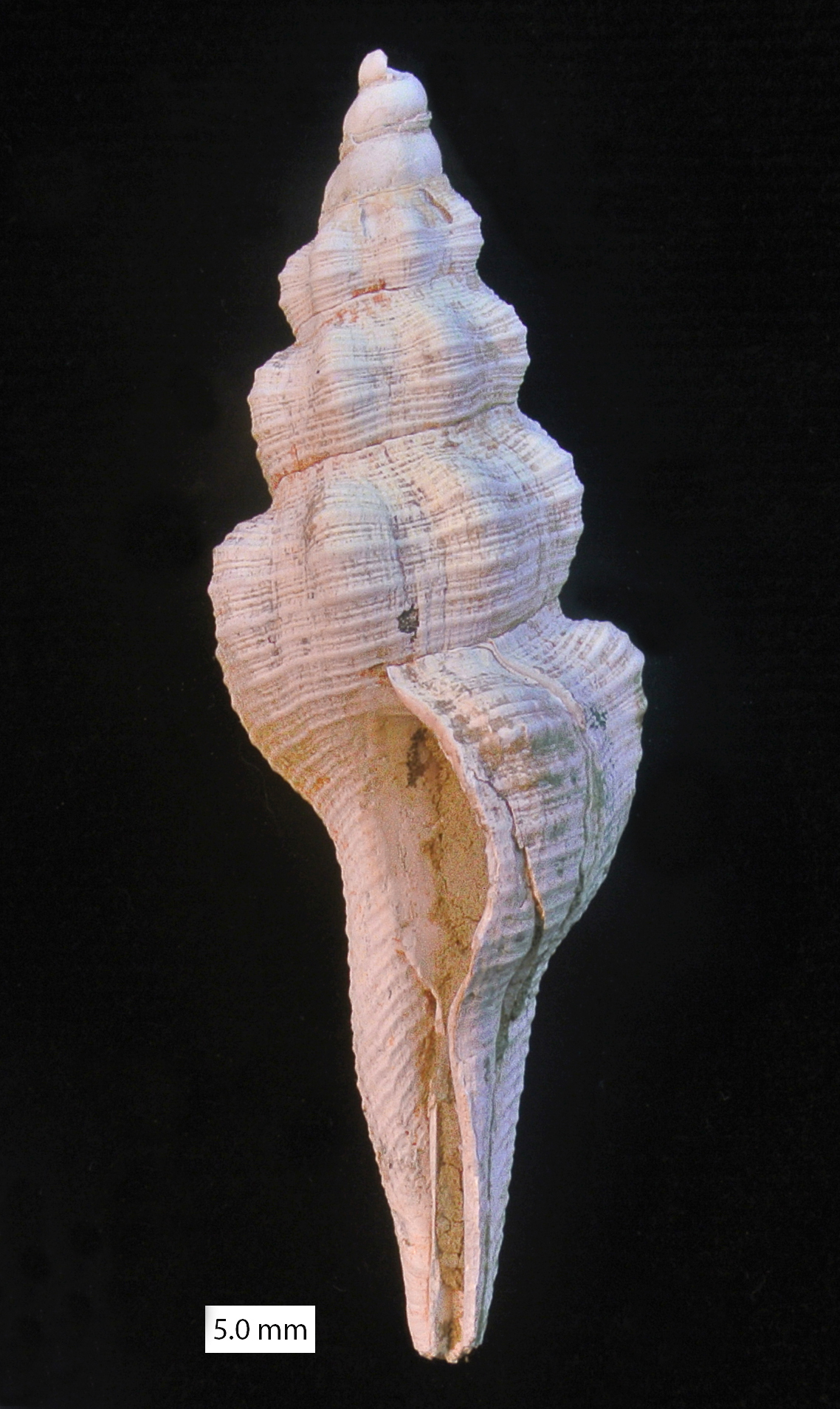
Fusinus sp. from the Pliocene of Cyprus.

The recent species inhabit tropical to temperate waters.

== Description ==
The anatomy of Fasciolariidae and Buccinidae is very similar. Distinction is usually made on basis of differences in the radula and the stomach anatomy.

The shells are usually reddish in color and have a moderate to large size, reaching a height between 1.0 and 60 cm. The shells are spindle-shaped and biconic. The spire is elongated. The siphonal canal is well developed and is long to moderately long. The columella varies between a smooth appearance and showing spiral folds. The horny operculum has an oval shape. Their radula is characteristic with narrow central teeth with three cusps. The wide lateral teeth show numerous ctenoid (= comblike) cusps.

Snails in the family Fasciolariidae are carnivorous. They feed on other gastropods and on bivalves. Some also prey on worms and barnacles.

The snails are gonochoristic, i.e. the individuals have just one sex. The female snails deposit their eggs in horny capsules either in a single form or in clusters arranged around a hollow axis. The single forms have a flattened, disk-shaped, or vase-shaped form. The clusters are hemispherical or cylindrical. Development is usually direct. The larvae emerge from the capsules as free-swimming young or as crawling young.

== Taxonomy ==
According to the taxonomy of the Gastropoda by Bouchet & Rocroi (2005), the Fasciolariidae consist of the following subfamilies:

- Clavilithinae Vermeij & Snyder, 2018 †
- Fasciolariinae Gray, 1853
- Fusininae Wrigley, 1927 - synonyms: Fusinae Swainson, 1840 (inv.); Cyrtulidae MacDonald, 1869; Streptochetinae Cossmann, 1901
- Peristerniinae Tryon, 1880 - synonym: Latiridae Iredale, 1929

== Genera ==
Genera in the family Fasciolariidae include (fossil genera are marked with a dagger):

subfamily Clavilithinae Vermeij & Snyder, 2018 †

- † Africolithes Eames, 1957
- † Austrolithes Finlay, 1931
- † Chiralithes Olsson, 1930
- † Clavellofusus Grabau, 1904
- † Clavilithes Swainson, 1840
- † Cosmolithes Grabau, 1904
- † Mancorus Olsson, 1931
- † Papillina Conrad, 1855
- † Perulithes Olsson, 1930
- † Clavella Swainson, 1835 accepted as Clavilithes Swainson, 1840 † (Junior homonym of Clavella Oken, 1815. Has been renamed Clavilithes.)
- † Rhopalithes Grabau, 1904 accepted as Clavilithes Swainson, 1840 † (objective synonym)
- † Turrispira Conrad, 1866 accepted as Clavilithes Swainson, 1840 †
- † Daphnobela Cossmann, 1896
- † Euthriofusus Cossmann, 1901

subfamily Fasciolariinae

- Fasciolaria Lamarck, 1799 - type genus, the Tulip shells
- Africolaria Snyder, Vermeij & Lyons, 2012
- Aurantilaria Snyder, Vermeij & Lyons, 2012
- Australaria Snyder, Vermeij & Lyons, 2012
- Bellifusus Stephenson, 1941 †
- Boltenella Wade, 1917 †
- Brucia Cossmann, 1920 †
- Calkota Squires & Saul, 2003
- Cinctura Hollister, 1957
- Conradconfusus Snyder, 2002 †
- Cryptorhytis Meek, 1876 †
- Drilliovoluta Cossmann, 1925 †
- Drilluta Wade, 1916 †
- Filifusus Snyder, Vermeij & Lyons, 2012
- Glaphyrina Finlay, 1926
- Granolaria Snyder, Vermeij & Lyons, 2012
- Haplovoluta Wade, 1918 †
- Hercorhyncus Conrad, 1869 †
- Hylus Wade, 1917 †
- Kilburnia Snyder, Vermeij & Lyons, 2012
- Liochlamys Dall, 1889 †
- Lirofusus Conrad, 1865 †
- Lugubrilaria Snyder, Vermeij & Lyons, 2012
- Lyonsifusus Vermeij & Snyder, 2018
- Mariafusus Petuch, 1988 †
- Micasarcina Squires & Saul, 2003 †
- Microcolus Cotton & Godfrey, 1932
- Microfulgur Finlay & Marwick, 1937
- Mylecoma Squires & Saul, 2003 †
- Odontofusus Whitfield, 1892 †
- Paleopsephaea Wade, 1926 †
- Parafusus Wade, 1918 †
- Perse B.L. Clark, 1918 †
- Piestochilus Meek, 1864 †
- Plectocion Stewart, 1927 †
- Pleia Finlay, 1930
- Pleuroploca P. Fischer, 1884
- Pliculofusus Snyder, Vermeij & Lyons, 2012 †
- Saginafusus Iredale, 1931
- Scobina Wade, 1917 †
- Serrifusus Meek, 1876 †
- Skyles Saul & Popenoe, 1993 †
- Terebraspira Conrad, 1862 †
- Trichifusus Bandel, 2000 †
- Triplofusus Olsson & Harbison, 1953
- Wadia Cossmann, 1920 †
- Whitneyella Stewart, 1927 †
- Woodsella Wade, 1926 †

subfamily Fusininae

- Fusus Bruguière, 1789 : synonym of Fusinus Rafinesque, 1815
- Aegeofusinus Russo, 2017
- Africofusus Vermeij & Snyder, 2018
- Amiantofusus Fraussen, Kantor & Hadorn, 2007
- † Angustifusus Vermeij & Snyder, 2018
- Apertifusus Vermeij & Snyder, 2018
- Aptyxis Troschel, 1868
- Araiofusus Callomon & Snyder, 2017
- Ariefusus Vermeij & Snyder, 2018
- Aristofusus Vermeij & Snyder, 2018
- Barbarofusus Grabau & Shimer, 1909
- Callifusus Vermeij & Snyder, 2018
- Chryseofusus Hadorn & Fraussen, 2003
- Cyrtulus Hinds, 1843 - Cyrtulus serotinus Hinds, 1843
- Enigmofusus Vermeij & Snyder, 2018
- † Eofusus Vermeij & Snyder, 2018
- Falsicolus Finlay, 1930
- Falsifusus Grabau, 1904 †
- Fredenia Cadée & Janssen, 1994 †
- Fusinus Rafinesque, 1815 - type genus of the subfamily Fusininae
- Gemmocolus Maxwell, 1992 †
- Goniofusus Vermeij & Snyder, 2018
- Gracilipurpura Jousseaume, 1880
- Granulifusus Kuroda & Habe, 1954
- Harasewychia Petuch, 1987
- Harfordia Dall, 1921
- Heilprinia Grabau, 1904
- Helolithus Agassiz, 1846 †
- Hesperaptyxis Snyder & Vermeij, 2016
- Lepidocolus Maxwell, 1992 †
- Liracolus Maxwell, 1992 †
- Lyonsifusus Vermeij & Snyder, 2018
- Marmorofusus Snyder & Lyons, 2014
- Okutanius Kantor, Fedosov, Snyder & Bouchet, 2018
- Ollaphon Iredale, 1929
- Priscofusus Conrad, 1865 †
- Profusinus Bandel, 2000 †
- Propefusus Iredale, 1924
- Pseudaptyxis Petuch, 1988 †
- Pullincola de Gregorio, 1894 †
- Remera Stephenson, 1941 †
- Rhopalithes Grabau, 1904 †
- Simplicifusus Kira, 1972
- Solutofusus Pritchard, 1898 †
- Spirilla Agassiz, 1842 †
- Streptocarina Hinsch, 1977 †
- Streptochetus Cossmann, 1889 †
- Streptodictyon Tembrock, 1961 †
- Streptolathyrus Cossmann, 1901 †
- Tectifusus Tate, 1893 †
- Trophonofusus Kuroda & Habe, 1971
- Turrispira Conrad, 1866 †
- Vermeijius Kantor, Fedosov, Snyder & Bouchet, 2018
- Viridifusus Snyder, Vermeij & Lyons, 2012

subfamily Peristerniinae

- Peristernia Mörch, 1852 - type genus of the subfamily Peristerniinae
- Aptycholathyrus Cossman & Pissarro, 1905 †
- Ascolatirus Bellardi, 1884 †
- Benimakia Habe, 1958
- Brocchitas Finlay, 1927 †
- Bullockus Lyons & Snyder, 2008
- Dennantia Tate, 1888 †
- Dentifusus Vermeij & Rosenberg, 2003
- Eolatirus Bellardi, 1884 †
- Exilifusus Conrad, 1865 †
- Fractolatirus Iredale, 1936
- Fusolatirus Kuroda & Habe, 1971
- Hemipolygona Rovereto, 1899
- Lathyropsis Oostingh, 1939 †
- Latirofusus Cossmann, 1889
- Latirogona Laws, 1944 †
- Latirolagena Harris, 1897
- Latirulus Cossmann, 1889
- Latirus Montfort, 1810
- Leucozonia Gray, 1847
- Lightbournus Lyons & Snyder, 2008
- Liochlamys Dall, 1889 †
- Mazzalina Conrad, 1960 †
- Neolatirus Bellardi, 1884 †
- Nodolatirus Bouchet & Snyder, 2013
- Nodopelagia Hedley, 1915
- Opeatostoma Berry, 1958
- Plesiolatirus Bellardi, 1884 †
- Plicatella Swainson, 1840
- Polygona Schumacher, 1817
- Psammostoma Vermeij & Snyder, 2002 †
- Pseudolatirus Bellardi, 1884
- Pustulatirus Vermeij & Snyder, 2006
- Ruscula Casey, 1904 †
- Streptopelma Cossmann, 1901 †
- Tarantinaea Monterosato, 1917
- Taron Hutton, 1883
- Teralatirus Coomans, 1965
- Turrilatirus Vermeij & M.A. Snyder, 2006

Subfamily ?

- Crassibougia Stahlschmidt & Fraussen, 2012
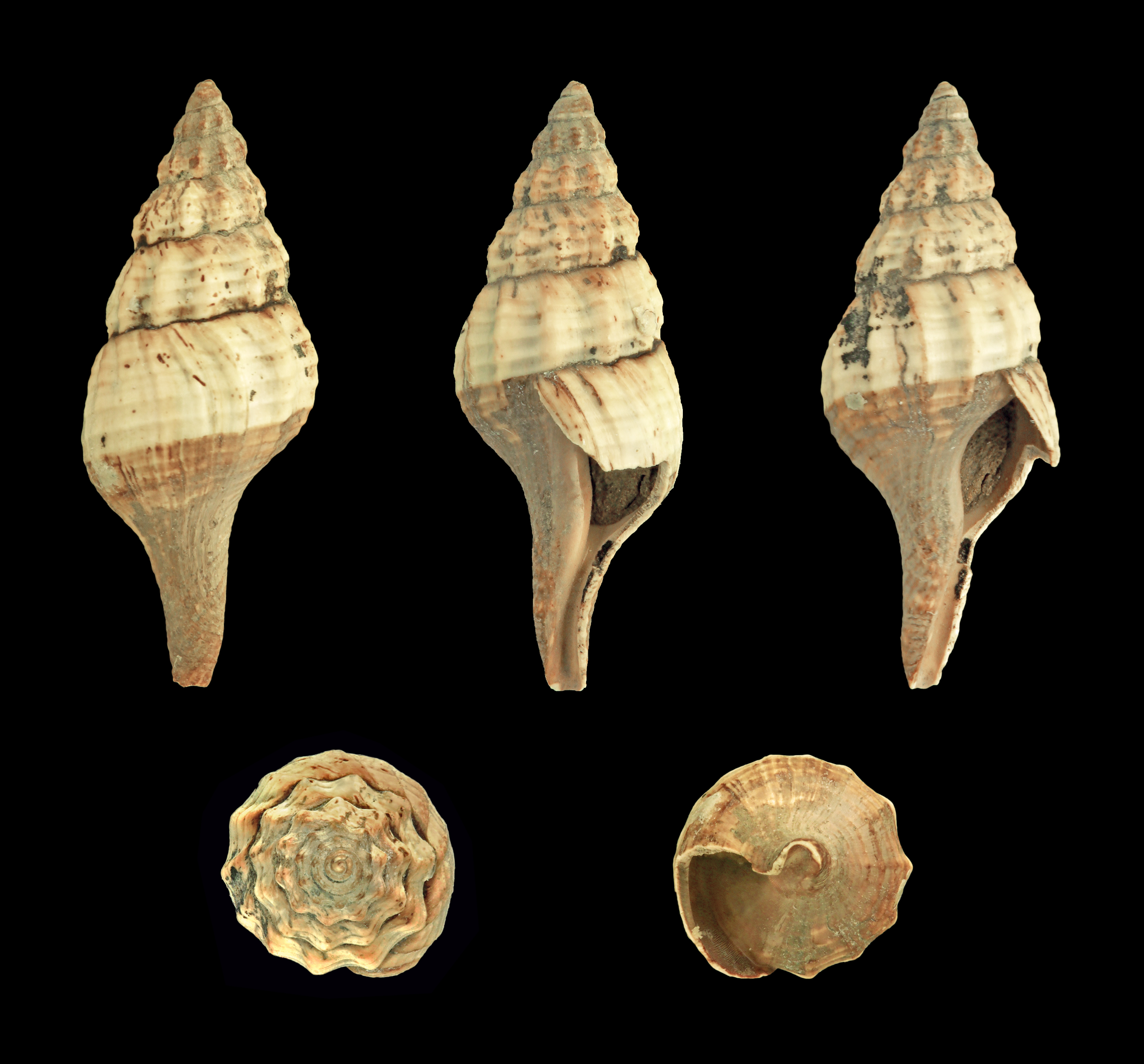
Aquilofusus semiglaber

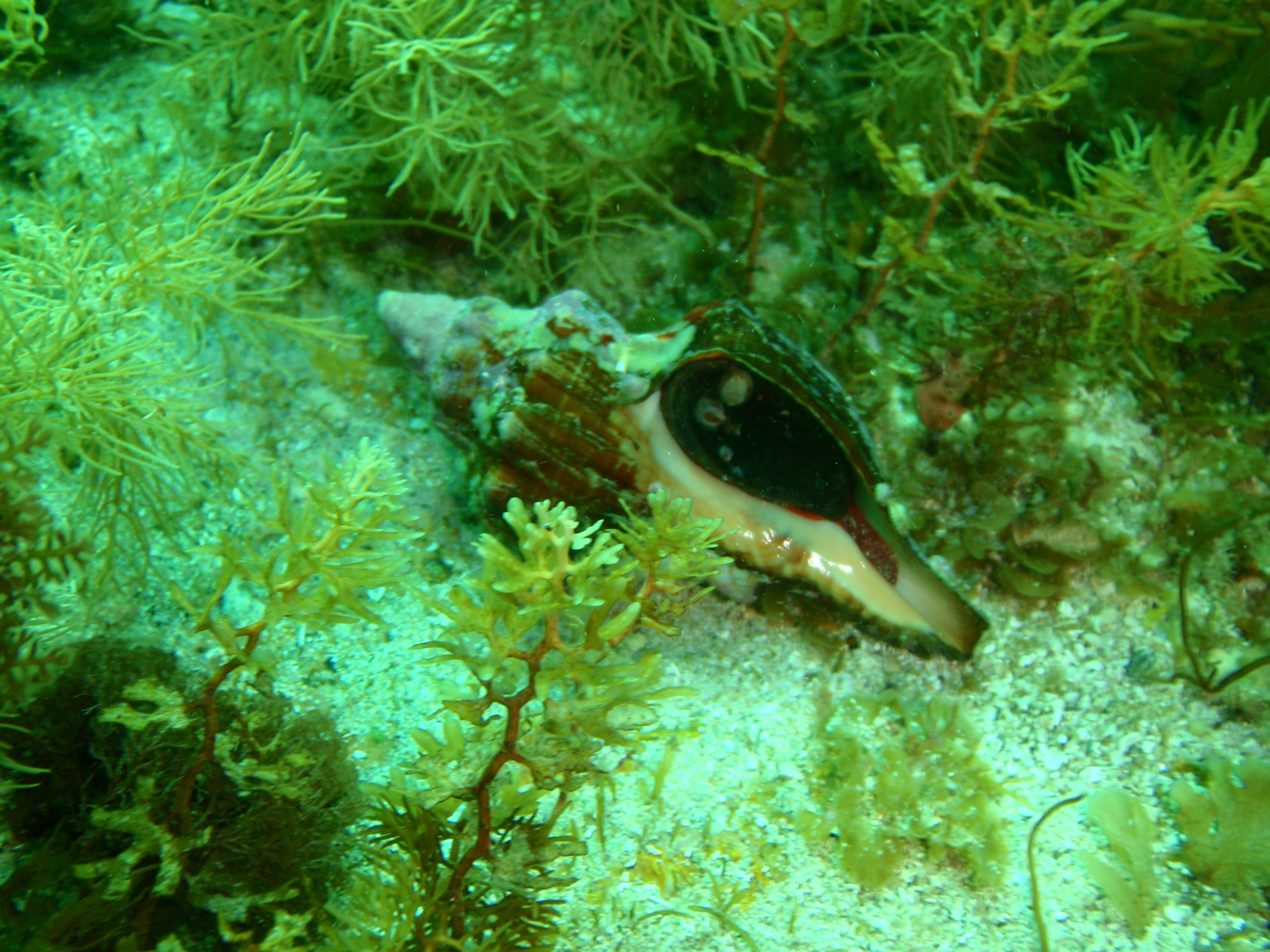
Australaria australasia

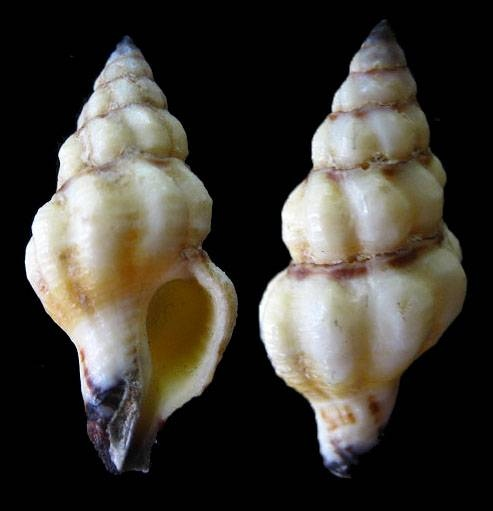
Benimakia marquesana

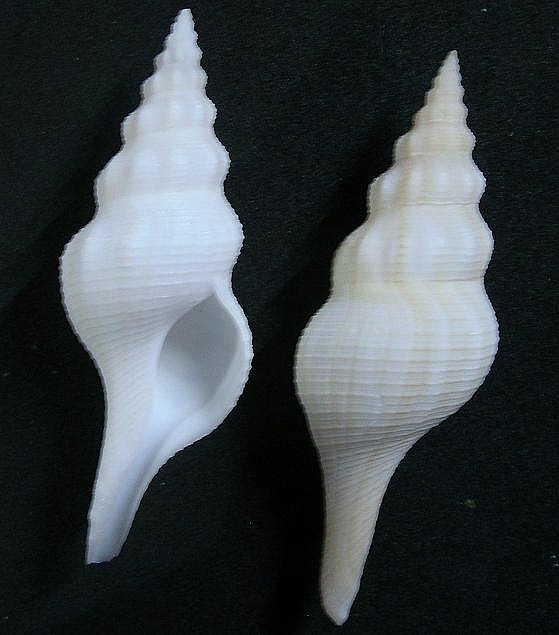
Chryseofusus jurgeni

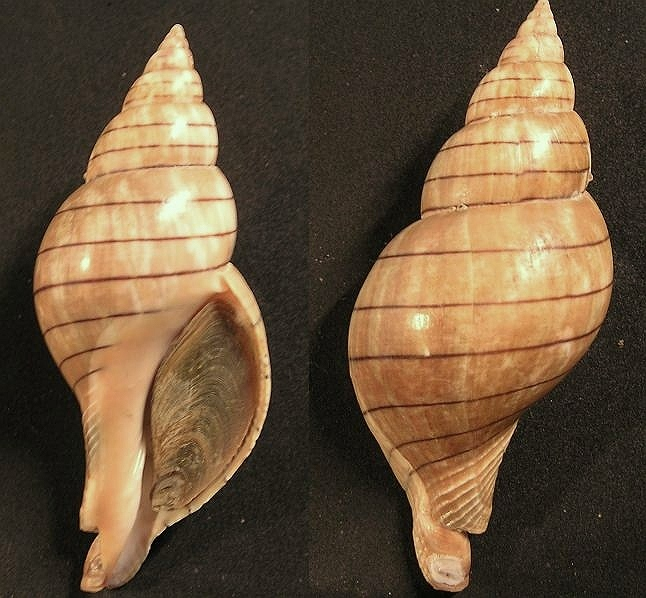
Cinctura hunteria

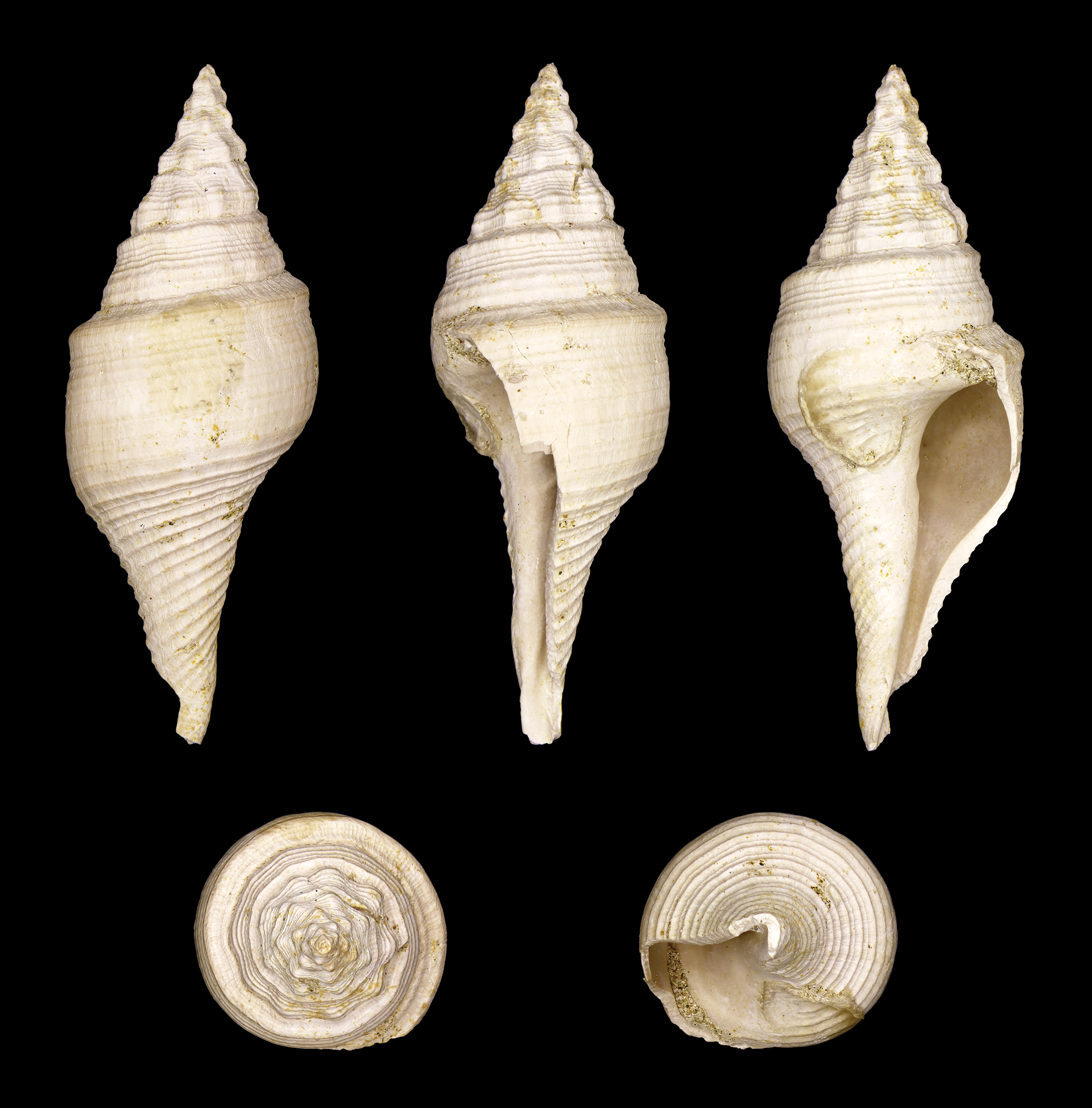
Clavilithes laevigatus

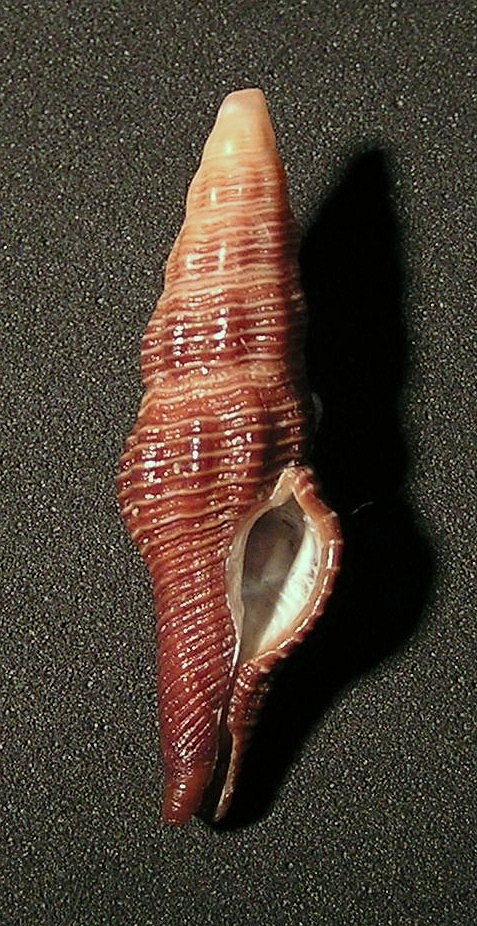
Dolicholatirus bairstowi

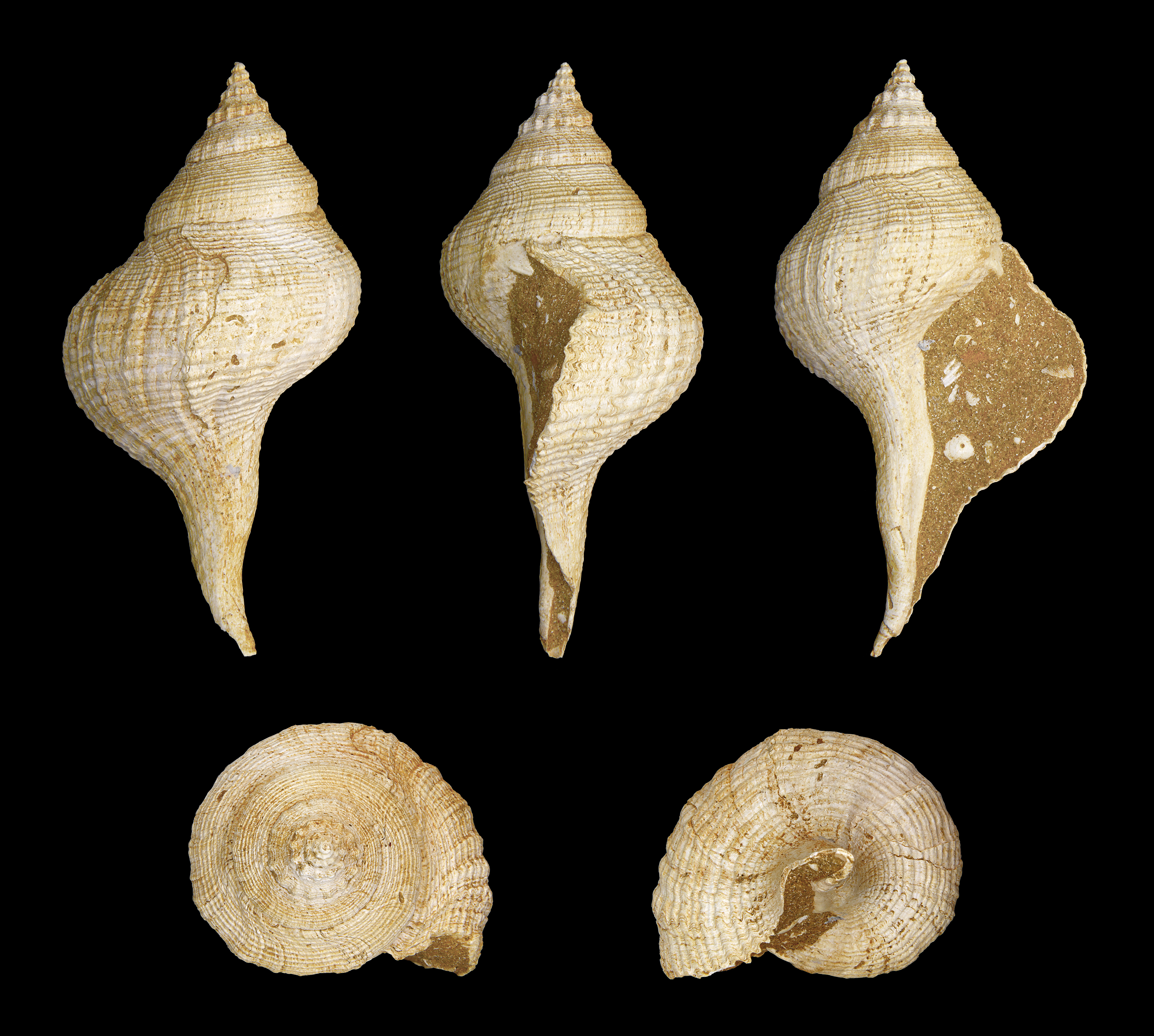
Euthriofusus burdigalensis

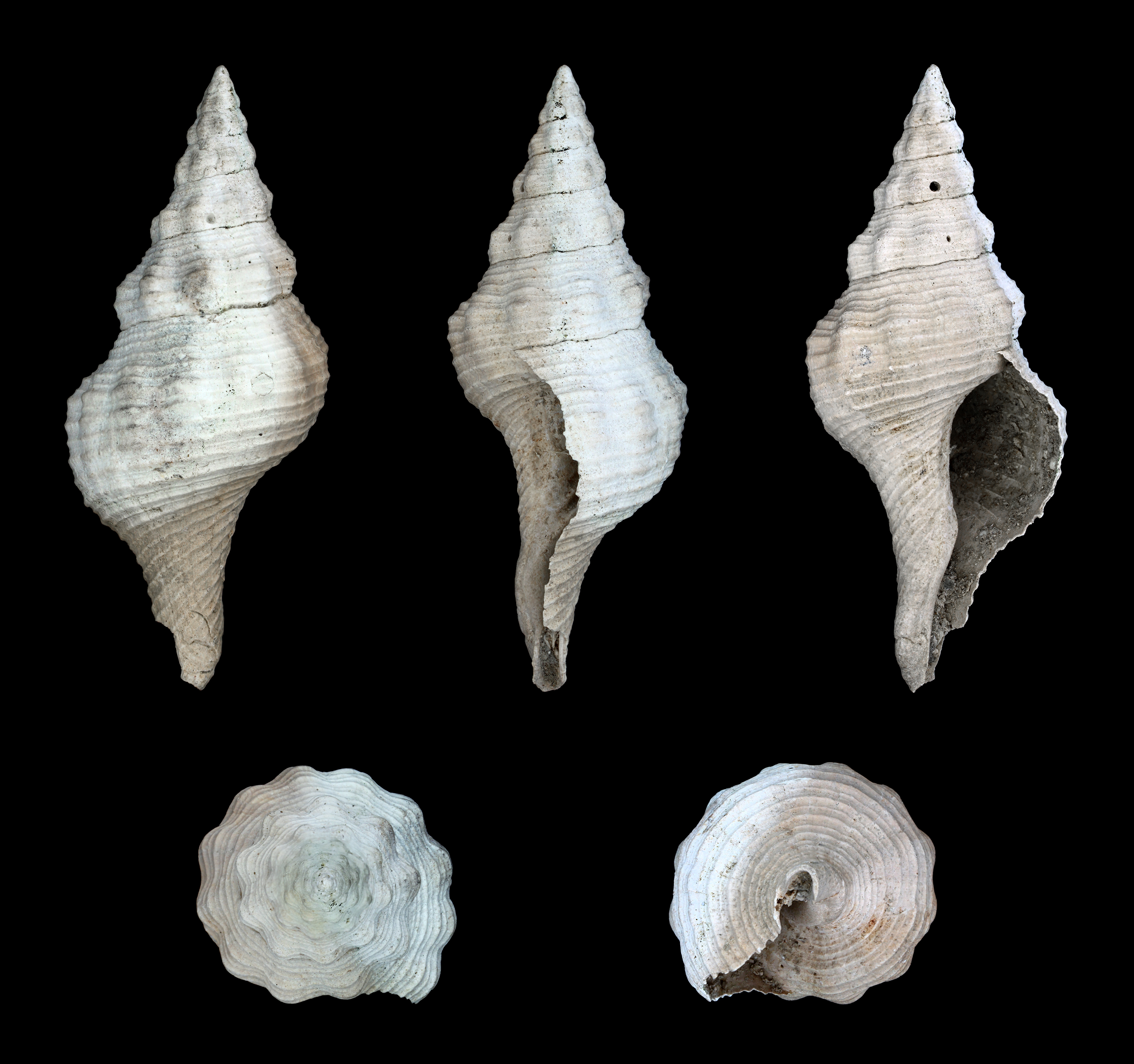
Fasciolaria scalarina

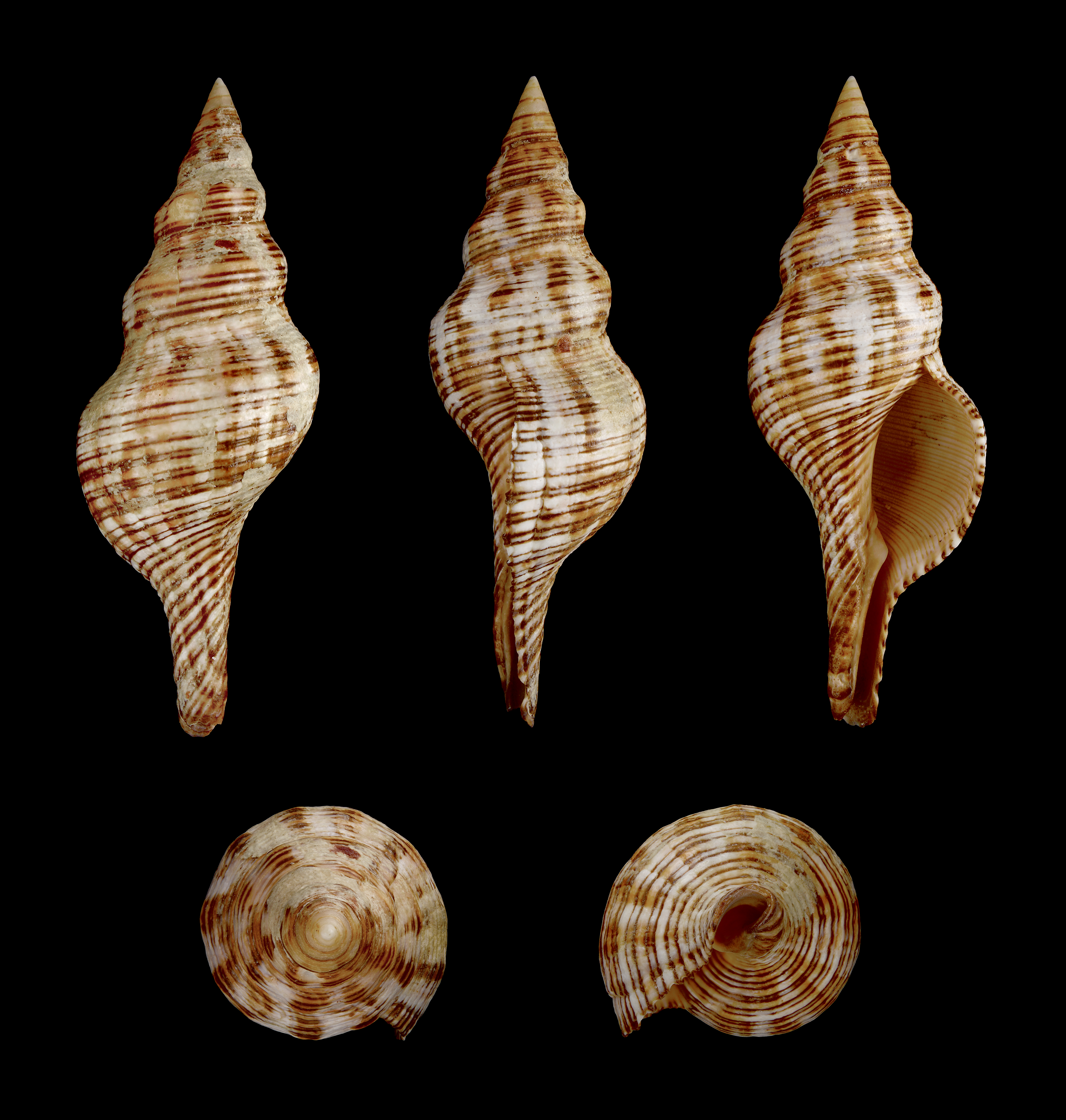
Filifusus filamentosus

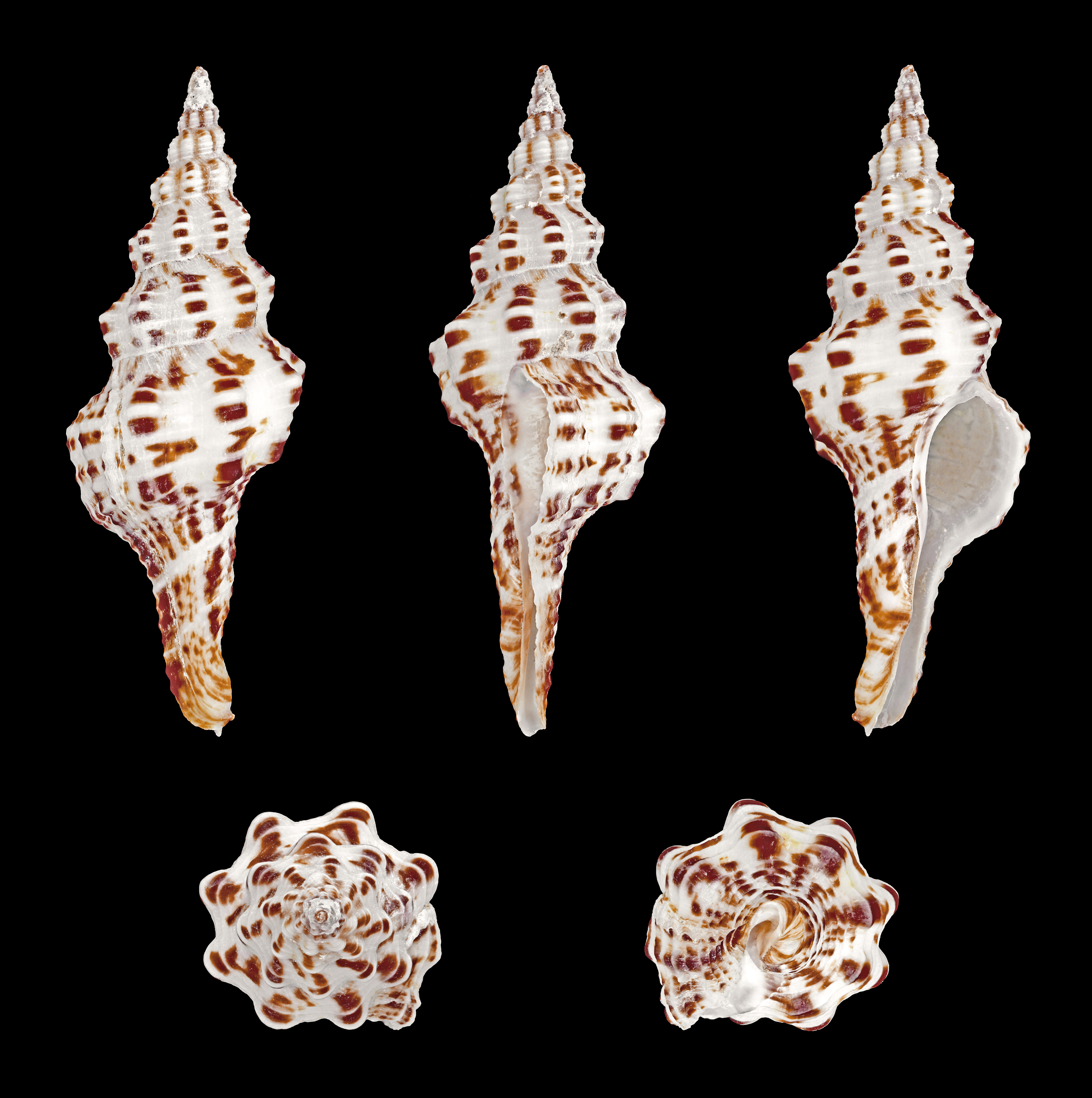
Fusinus polygonoides

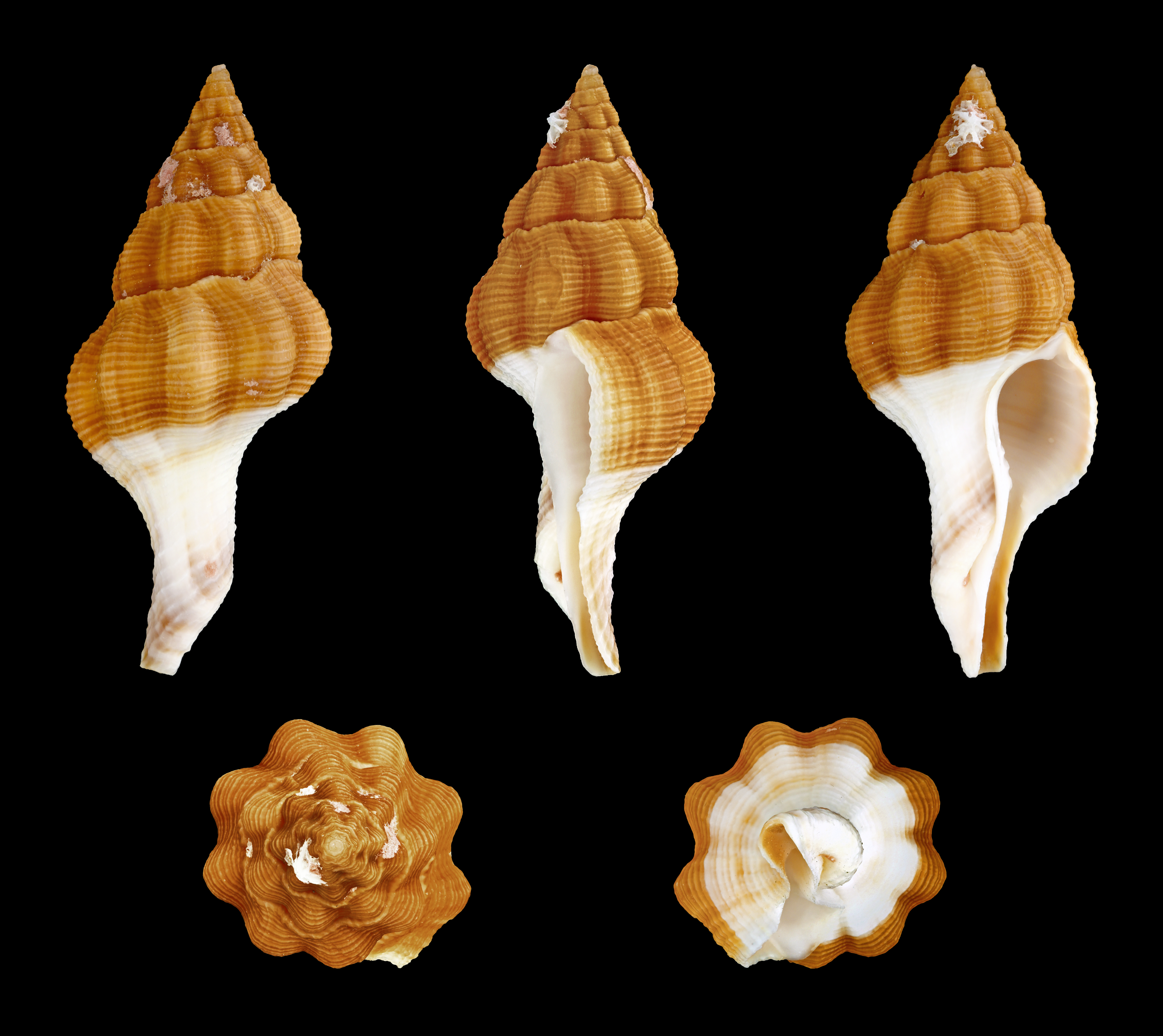
Fusolatirus paetelianus

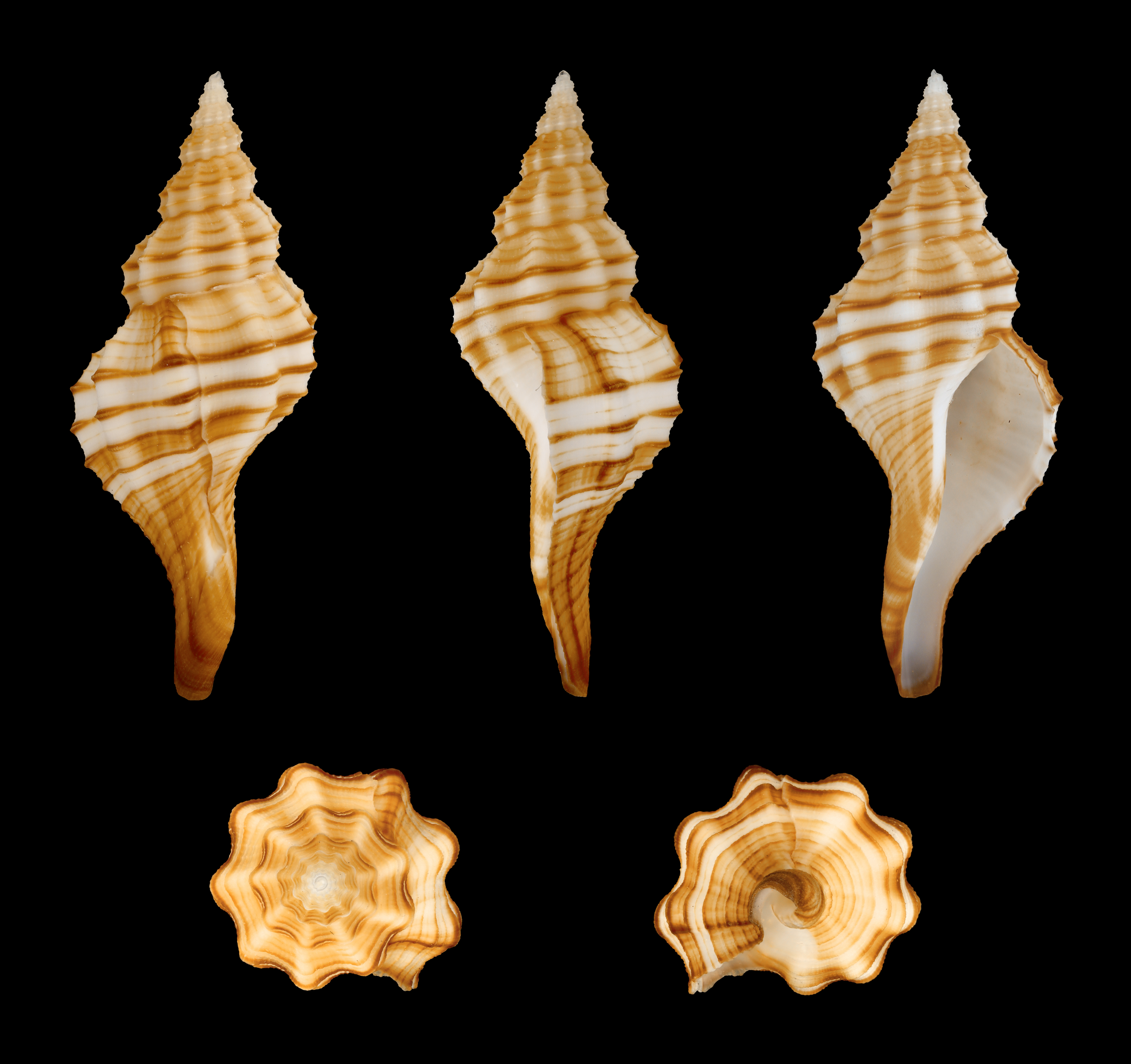
Granulifusus dondani

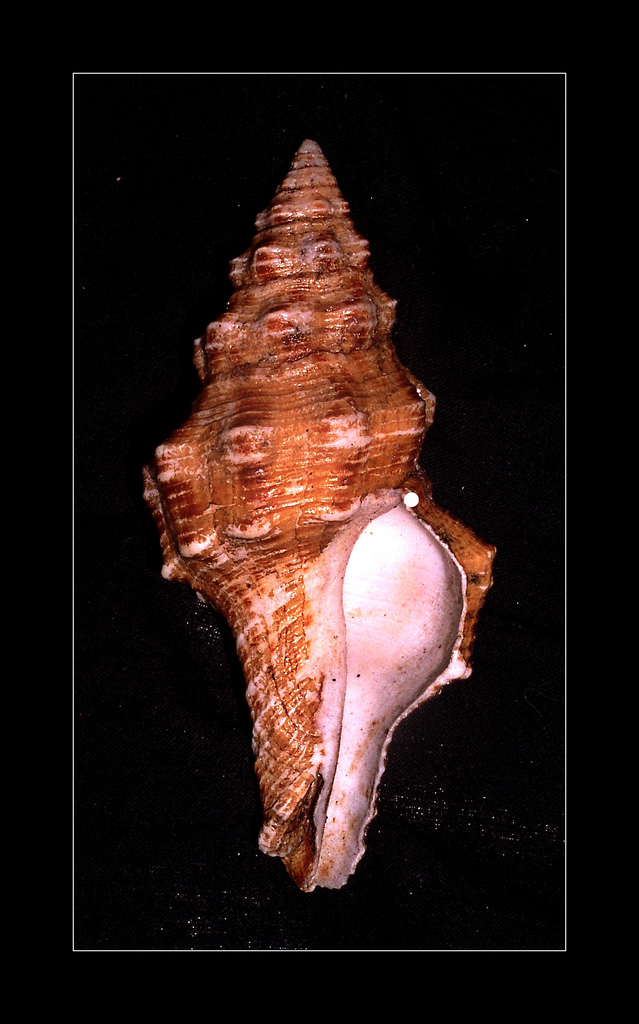
Latirus polygonus

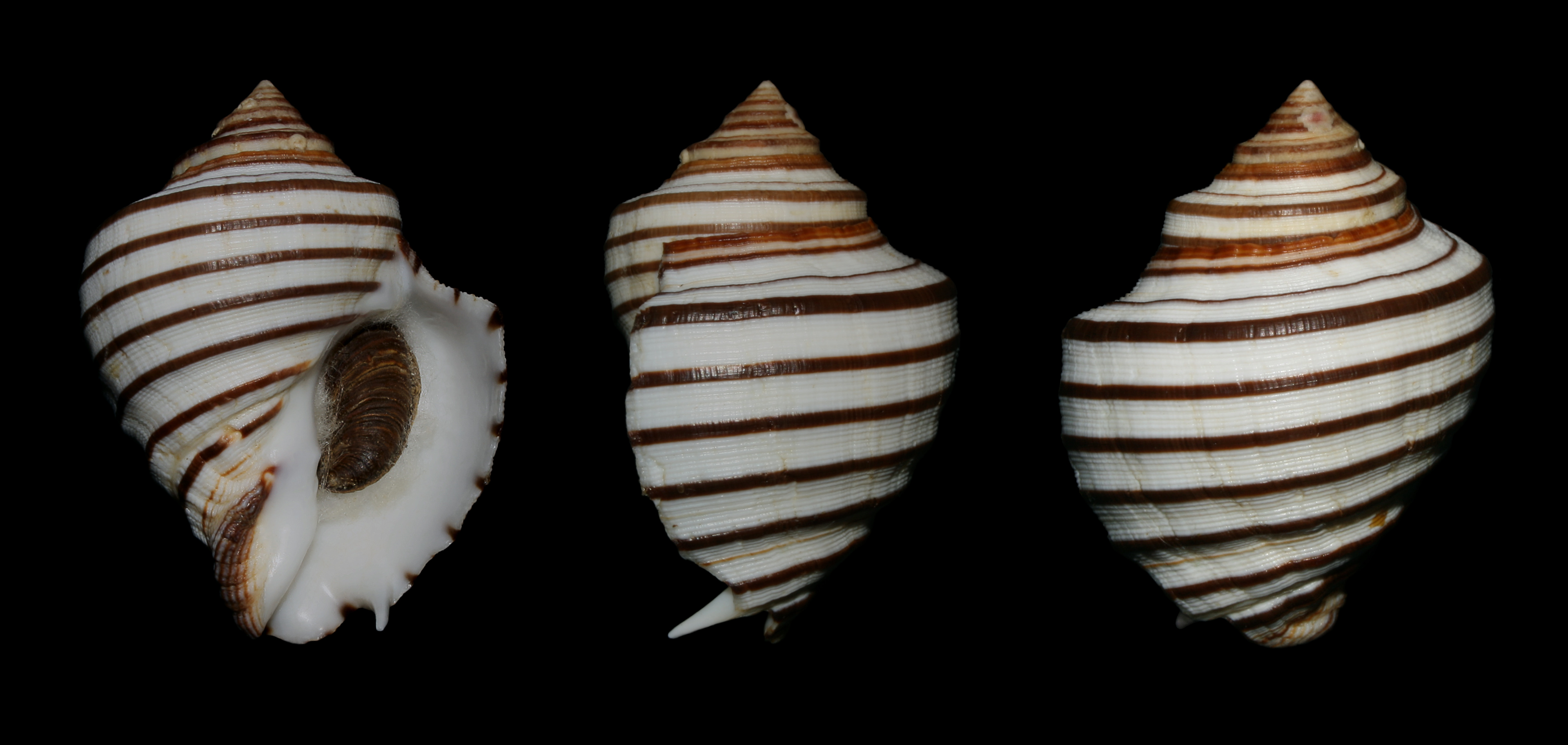
Opeatostoma pseudodon

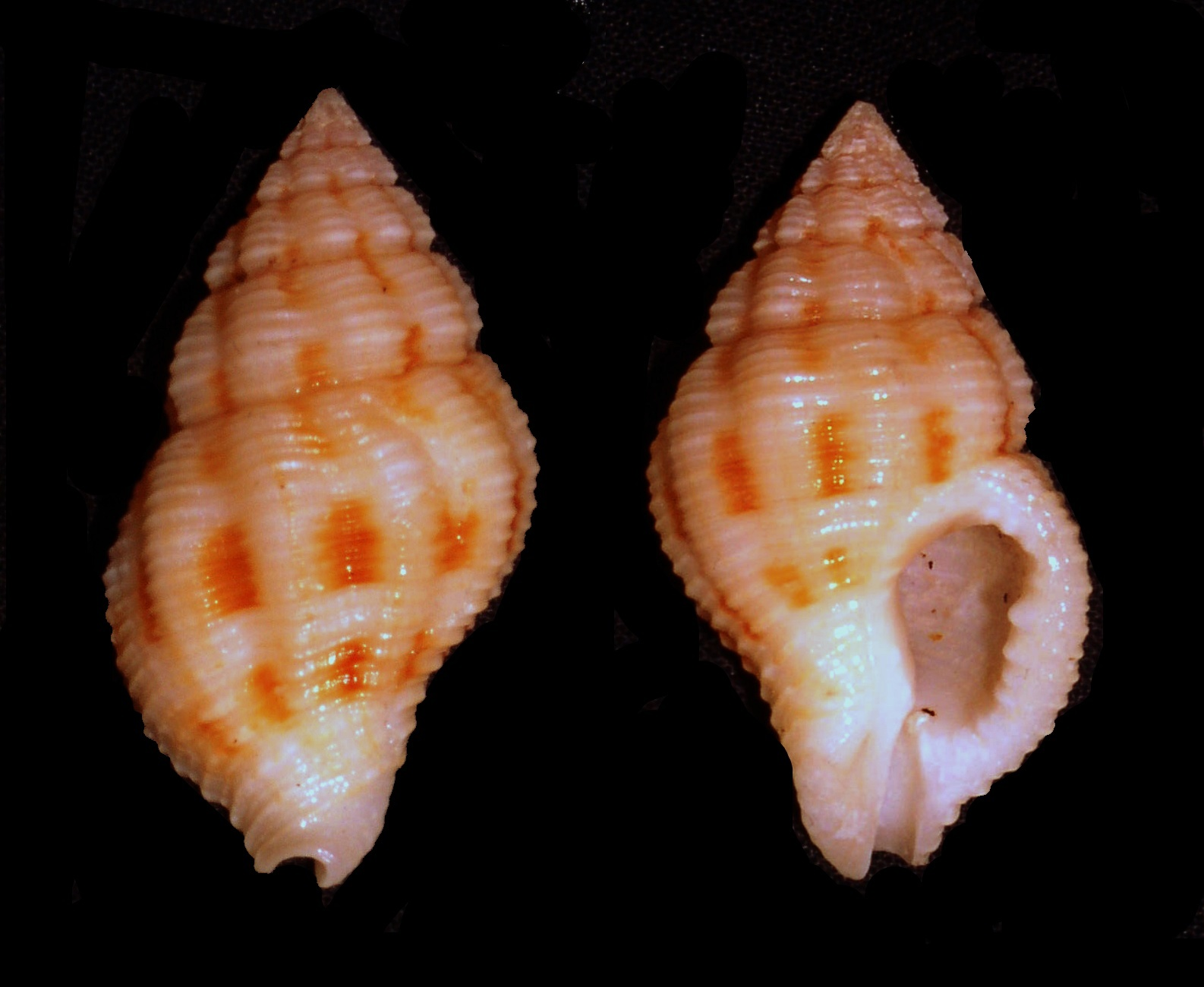
Peristernia nassatula

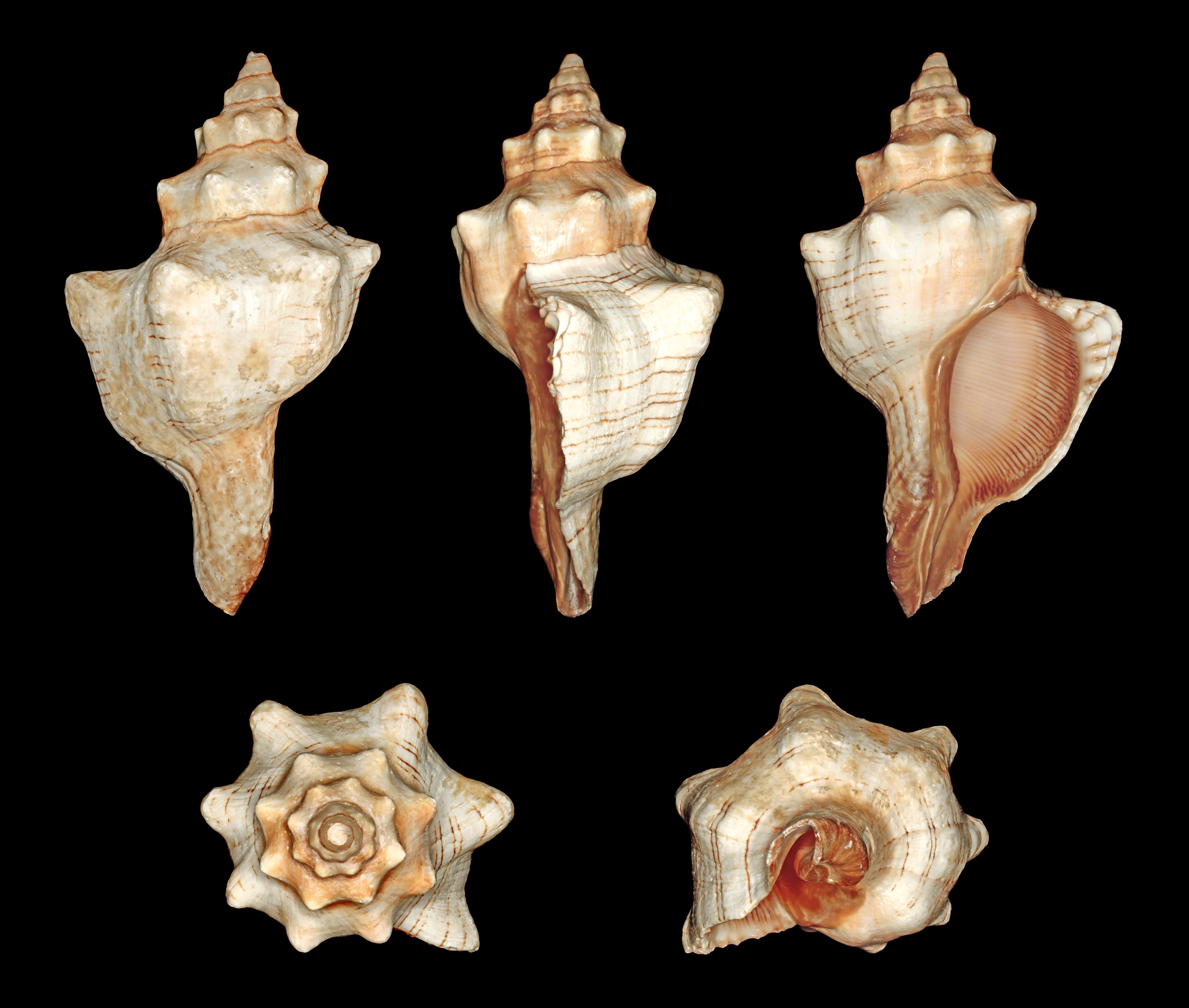
Pleuroploca trapezium

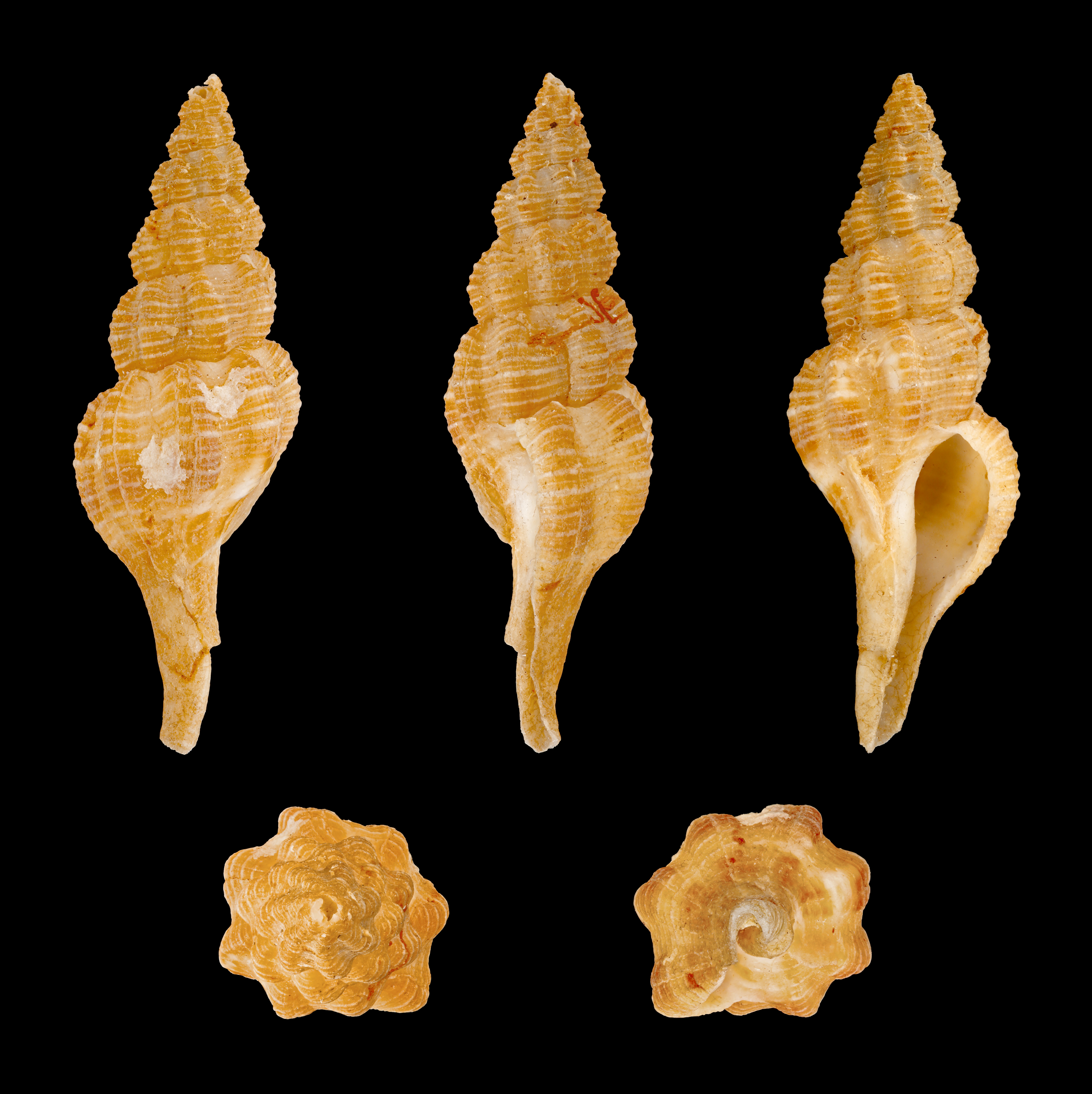
Pseudolatirus kuroseanus

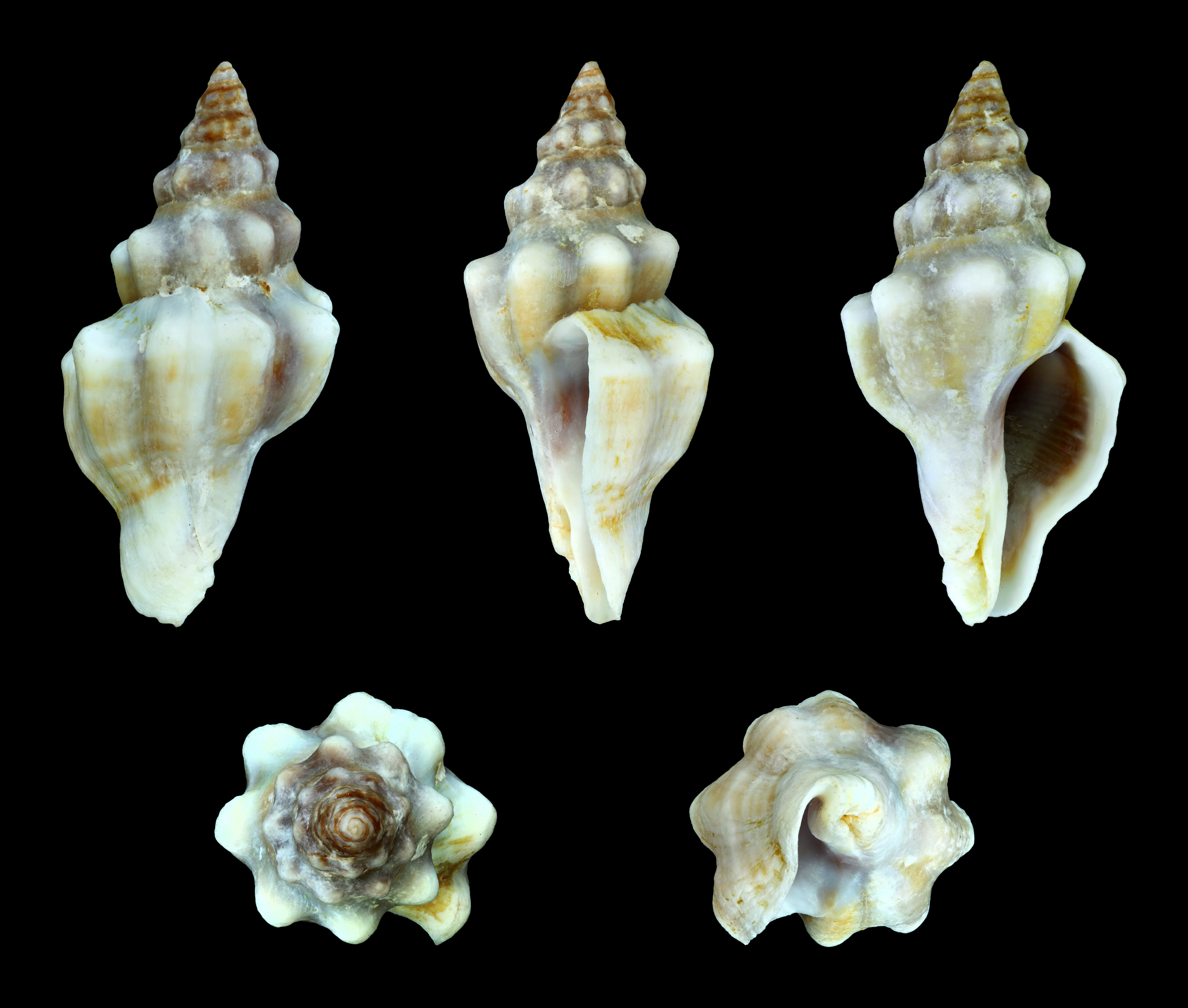
Tarantinaea lignarius

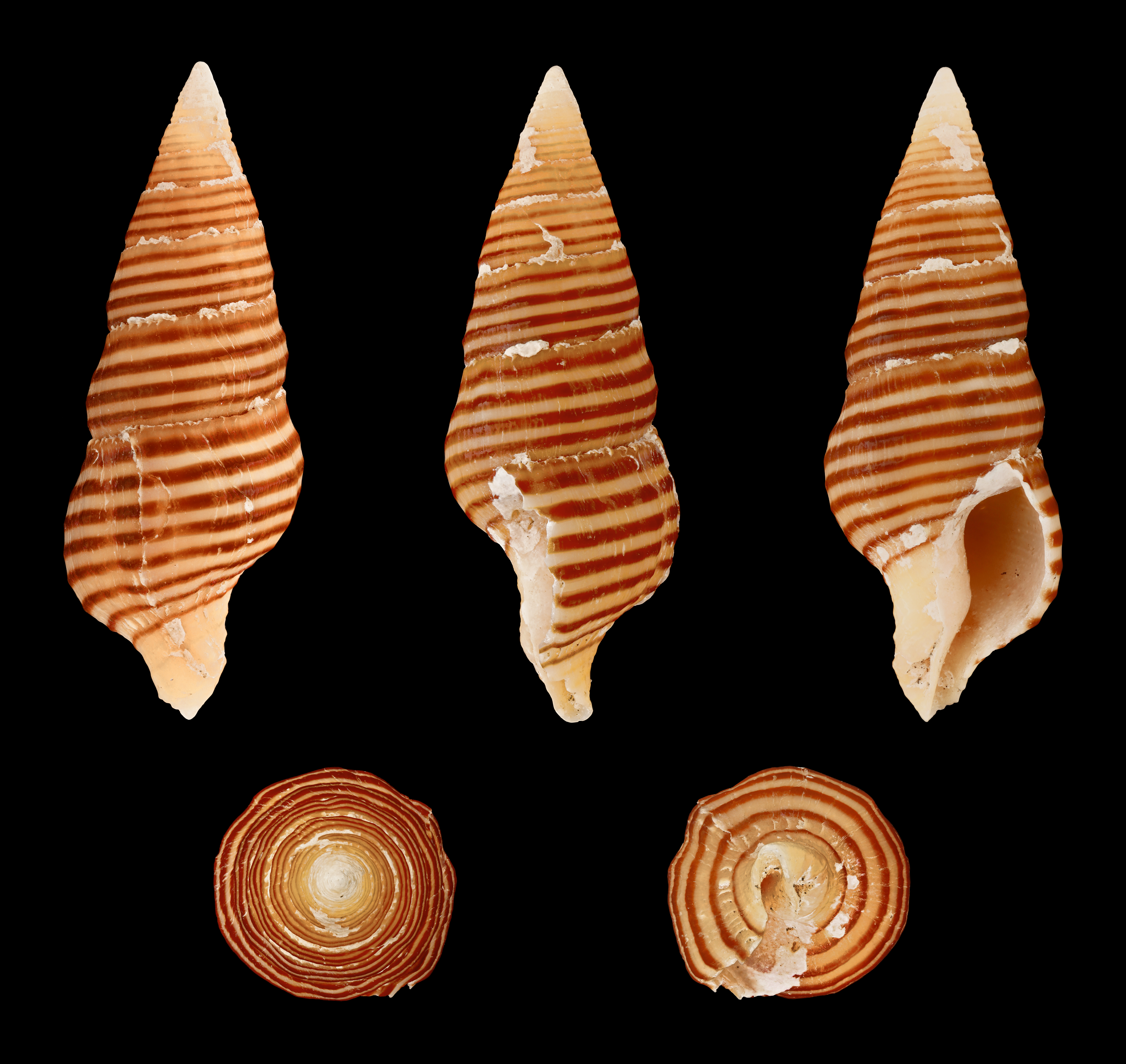
Turrilatirus turritus

Genera brought into synonymy

- Aptyxis Troschel, 1868: synonym of Fusinus Rafinesque, 1815
- Buccinofusus Conrad, 1868: synonym of Conradconfusus Snyder, 2002 †
- Bulbifusus Conrad, 1865 †: synonym of Mazzalina Conrad, 1960 †
- Chasca Clench & Aguayo, 1941: synonym of Chascax Watson, 1873: synonym of Hemipolygona Rovereto, 1899
- Chascax Watson, 1873: synonym of Hemipolygona Rovereto, 1899
- Cinctura Hollister, 1957: synonym of Fasciolaria Lamarck, 1799
- Clavella Swainson, 1835: synonym of Clavilithes Swainson, 1840 †
- Cymatium Link, 1807: synonym of Latirus Montfort, 1810
- Exilifusus Gabb, 1876 †: synonym of Fusinus Rafinesque, 1815
- Fusilatirus McGinty, 1955: synonym of Dolicholatirus Bellardi, 1884
- Fusus Bruguière, 1789: synonym of Fusinus Rafinesque, 1815
- Gracilipurpura Jousseaume, 1881 †: synonym of Fusinus Rafinesque, 1815
- Heilprinia Grabau, 1904: synonym of Fusinus Rafinesque, 1815
- Iaeranea Rafinesque, 1815: synonym of Fasciolaria Lamarck, 1799
- Lagena Schumacher, 1817: synonym of Latirolagena Harris, 1897
- Lathyrus Schinz, 1825: synonym of Latirus Montfort, 1810
- Latirofusus Cossmann, 1889: synonym of Dolicholatirus Bellardi, 1884
- Latyrus Carpenter, 1857: synonym of Latirus Montfort, 1810
- Propefusus Iredale, 1924: synonym of Fusinus Rafinesque, 1815
- Pseudofusus Monterosato, 1884: synonym of Fusinus Rafinesque, 1815
- Pseudolatirus Cossmann, 1889 †: synonym of Streptolathyrus Cossmann, 1901 †
- Simplicifusus Kira, 1972: synonym of Granulifusus Kuroda & Habe, 1954
- Sinistralia H. Adams & A. Adams, 1853: synonym of Fusinus Rafinesque, 1815
- Tarantinaea Monterosato, 1917: synonym of Fasciolaria Lamarck, 1799
