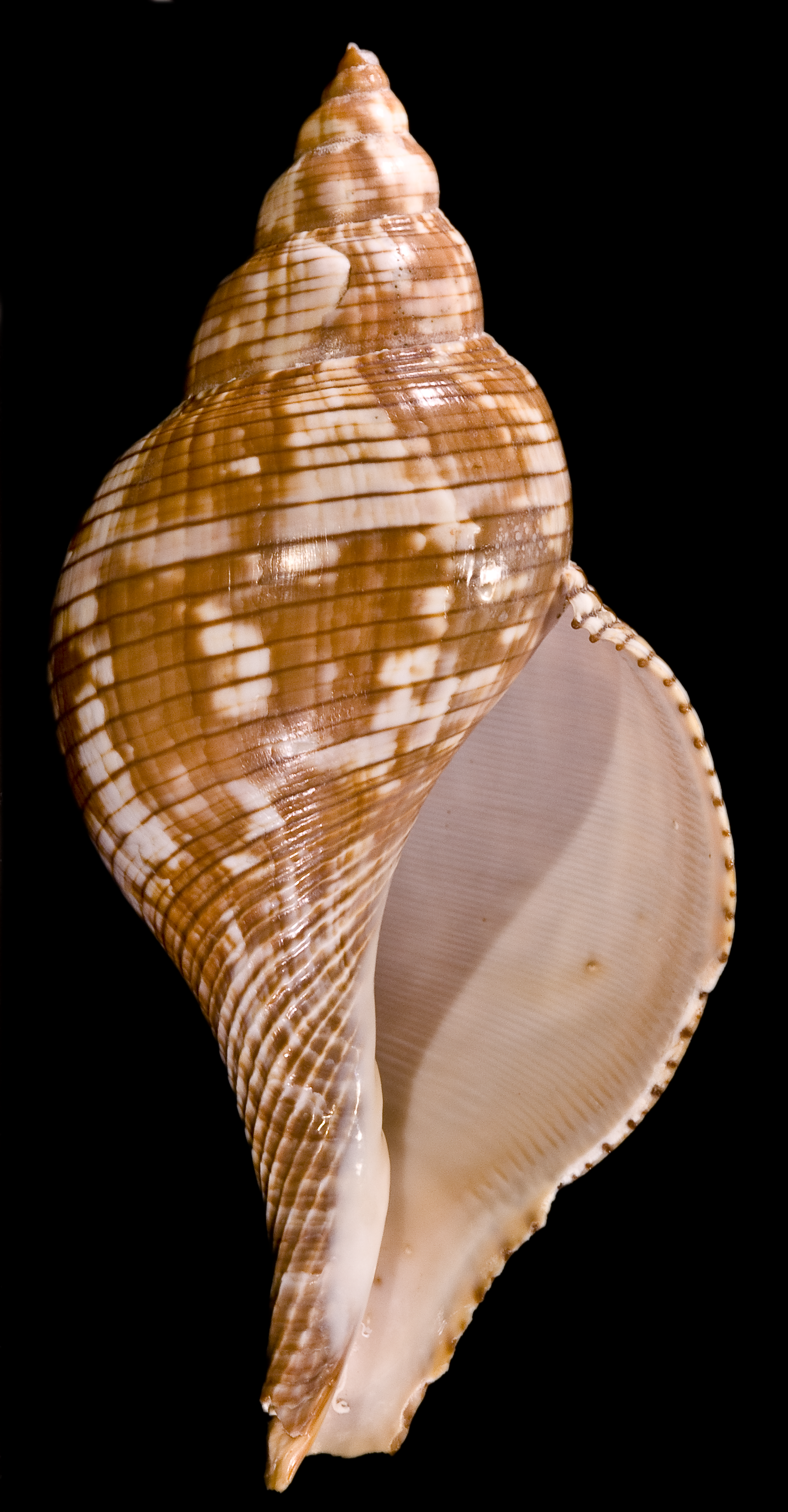
- Apertural view of the shell of a Fasciolaria tulipa.

Scientific classification
- Kingdom: Animalia
- Phylum: Mollusca
- Class: Gastropoda
- Subclass: Caenogastropoda
- Order: Neogastropoda
- Superfamily: Buccinoidea
- Family: Fasciolariidae
- Subfamily: Fasciolariinae
- Genus: Fasciolaria; Lamarck, 1799

Type species
- Murex tulipa Linnaeus, 1758

Synonyms
- Cinctura Hollister, 1957 (synonym or subgenus of Fasciolaria.); Iaeranea Rafinesque, 1815; Tarantinaea Monterosato, 1917

= Fasciolaria =

Genus of gastropods

Tulip snail or tulip shell is the common name for eight species of large, predatory, subtropical and tropical sea snails from the Western Atlantic. These species are in the genus Fasciolaria. They are marine gastropod mollusks in the family Fasciolariidae, the spindle shells, tulip shells and their allies.

The word "tulip" describes the overall shape of the shells of these species, which is like that of a closed tulip flower.

== Description ==
The shell is fusiform. The spire is acuminated. The aperture is oval, elongated, as long as the spire. The siphonal canal is straight. The columella is smooth, with a few oblique plaits at the fore part. The outer lip is internally crenate.

== Species ==
According to the World Register of Marine Species (WoRMS), and the Digital Atlas of Ancient Life for the Neogene of the Southeastern United States, the following species with a valid name are included within the genus Fasciolaria :

- † Fasciolaria apicina Dall, 1890
- Fasciolaria bullisi Lyons, 1972
- Fasciolaria curvirostris (Wood, 1828)
- † Fasciolaria evergladesensis E.J. Petuch, 1991
- Fasciolaria insularis Fernández, 1977
- Fasciolaria magna (Anton, 1838)
- † Fasciolaria monocingulata Dall, 1890
- † Fasciolaria okeechobensis Tucker & Wilson, 1932
- † Fasciolaria rhomboidea, W.B. and H.D. Rogers, 1839
- Fasciolaria sulcata (Anton, 1838)
- Fasciolaria tephrina De Souza, 2002
- Fasciolaria thersites (Reeve, 1847)
- Fasciolaria tulipa (Linnaeus, 1758) - the true tulip
  - Fasciolaria tulipa hollisteri Weisbord, 1962 , this species has a channeled suture

Species brought into synonymy

- Subgenus Fasciolaria (Mesorhytis) Meek, 1876: synonym of Mesorhytis Meek, 1876: synonym of Exilia Conrad, 1860
- Subgenus Fasciolaria (Pleuroploca) P. Fischer, 1884: synonym of Pleuroploca P. Fischer, 1884
- Fasciolaria acutispsira Strebel, 1911: synonym of Triplofusus princeps (G.B. Sowerby I, 1825)
- Fasciolaria agatha Simone & Abbate, 2005: synonym of Fusinus agatha (Simone & Abbate, 2005)
- Fasciolaria agulhasensis Tomlin, 1932: synonym of Kilburnia agulhasensis (Tomlin, 1932)
- Fasciolaria alfredensis Bartsch, 1915: synonym of Kilburnia alfredensis (Bartsch, 1915)
- Fasciolaria audouini Jonas, 1846: synonym of Pleuroploca audouini (Jonas, 1846)
- Fasciolaria aurantiaca Lamarck, 1816: synonym of Aurantilaria aurantiaca (Lamarck, 1816)
- Fasciolaria badia Krauss, 1848: synonym of Lugubrilaria badia (Krauss, 1848)
- Fasciolaria bakeri Gatliff & Gabriel, 1912: synonym of Australaria bakeri (Gatliff & Gabriel, 1912)
- Fasciolaria branhamae Rehder & Abbott, 1951: synonym of Cinctura branhamae (Rehder & Abbott, 1951)
- Fasciolaria clava Jonas, 1846: synonym of Pleuroploca clava (Jonas, 1846)
- Fasciolaria coronata Lamarck, 1822: synonym of Australaria coronata (Lamarck, 1822)
- Fasciolaria distans auct.: synonym of Fasciolaria lilium Fischer von Waldheim, 1807: synonym of Cinctura lilium (Fischer von Waldheim, 1807)
- Fasciolaria dunkeri Strebel, 1912: synonym of Kilburnia dunkeri (Strebel, 1911)
- Fasciolaria ferruginea Lamarck, 1822: synonym of Filifusus filamentosus (Röding, 1798)
- Fasciolaria filamentosa Lamarck, 1822: synonym of Filifusus filamentosus (Röding, 1798)
- Fasciolaria fusiformis Kiener, 1840: synonym of Australaria fusiformis (Kiener, 1840)
- Fasciolaria glabra Dunker, 1882: synonym of Filifusus glaber (Dunker, 1882)
- Fasciolaria granosa Broderip, 1832: synonym of Pleuroploca granosa (Broderip, 1832)
- Fasciolaria heynemanni Dunker, 1870: synonym of Kilburnia heynemanni (Dunker, 1870)
- Fasciolaria holcophorus Barnard, 1959: synonym of Metzgeria holcophorus (Barnard, 1959)
- Fasciolaria hollisteri Weisbord, 1962: synonym of Fasciolaria tulipa hollisteri Weisbord, 1962
- Fasciolaria hunteria (G. Perry, 1811): synonym of Cinctura hunteria (Perry, 1811)
- Fasciolaria inermis Jonas, 1846: synonym of Filifusus inermis (Jonas, 1846)
- Fasciolaria ligata Mighels & C.B. Adams, 1842: synonym of Ptychatractus ligatus (Mighels & C.B. Adams, 1842)
- Fasciolaria lignaria (Linnaeus, 1758): synonym of Tarantinaea lignarius (Linnaeus, 1758)
- Fasciolaria lilium G. Fischer von Waldheim, 1807 - the banded tulip: synonym of Cinctura lilium (Fischer von Waldheim, 1807)
- Fasciolaria lischkeana Dunker, 1863: synonym of Pleuroploca lischkeana (Dunker, 1863)
- Fasciolaria lugubris A. Adams & Reeve, 1847: synonym of Lugubrilaria lugubris (A. Adams & Reeve, 1847)
- Fasciolaria papillosa auct.: synonym of Triplofusus papillosus (G. B. Sowerby I, 1825)
- Fasciolaria ponderosa Jonas, 1850: synonym of Pleuroploca ponderosa (Jonas, 1850)
- Fasciolaria porphyrostoma Reeve, 1847: synonym of Afer porphyrostoma (Reeve, 1847)
- Fasciolaria princeps G.B. Sowerby I, 1825: synonym of Triplofusus princeps (G.B. Sowerby I, 1825)
- Fasciolaria purpurea Jonas, 1849: synonym of Pleuroploca purpurea (Jonas, 1849)
- Fasciolaria reevei Jonas, 1850: synonym of Triplofusus papillosus (G. B. Sowerby I, 1825)
- Fasciolaria rutila Watson, 1882: synonym of Africolaria rutila (Watson, 1882)
- Fasciolaria scholvieni Strebel, 1912: synonym of Kilburnia scholvieni (Strebel, 1911)
- Fasciolaria spirorbula Menke, 1829: synonym of Latirus spirorbulus (Menke, 1829)
- Fasciolaria strebeli Fulton, 1930: synonym of Kilburnia strebeli (Fulton, 1930)
- Fasciolaria thersites (Reeve, 1847): synonym of Africolaria thersites (Reeve, 1847)
- Fasciolaria trapezium (Linnaeus, 1758): synonym of Pleuroploca trapezium (Linnaeus, 1758)
- Fasciolaria tuberculata (Anton, 1838): synonym of Turbinella tuberculata Anton, 1838
- Fasciolaria valenciennesii Kiener, 1840: synonym of Granolaria valenciennesii (Kiener, 1840)
- Fasciolaria walleri Ladd, 1976: synonym of Euthria walleri (Ladd, 1976)
- Fasciolaria wattersae Kilburn, 1974: synonym of Africolaria wattersae (Kilburn, 1974)
