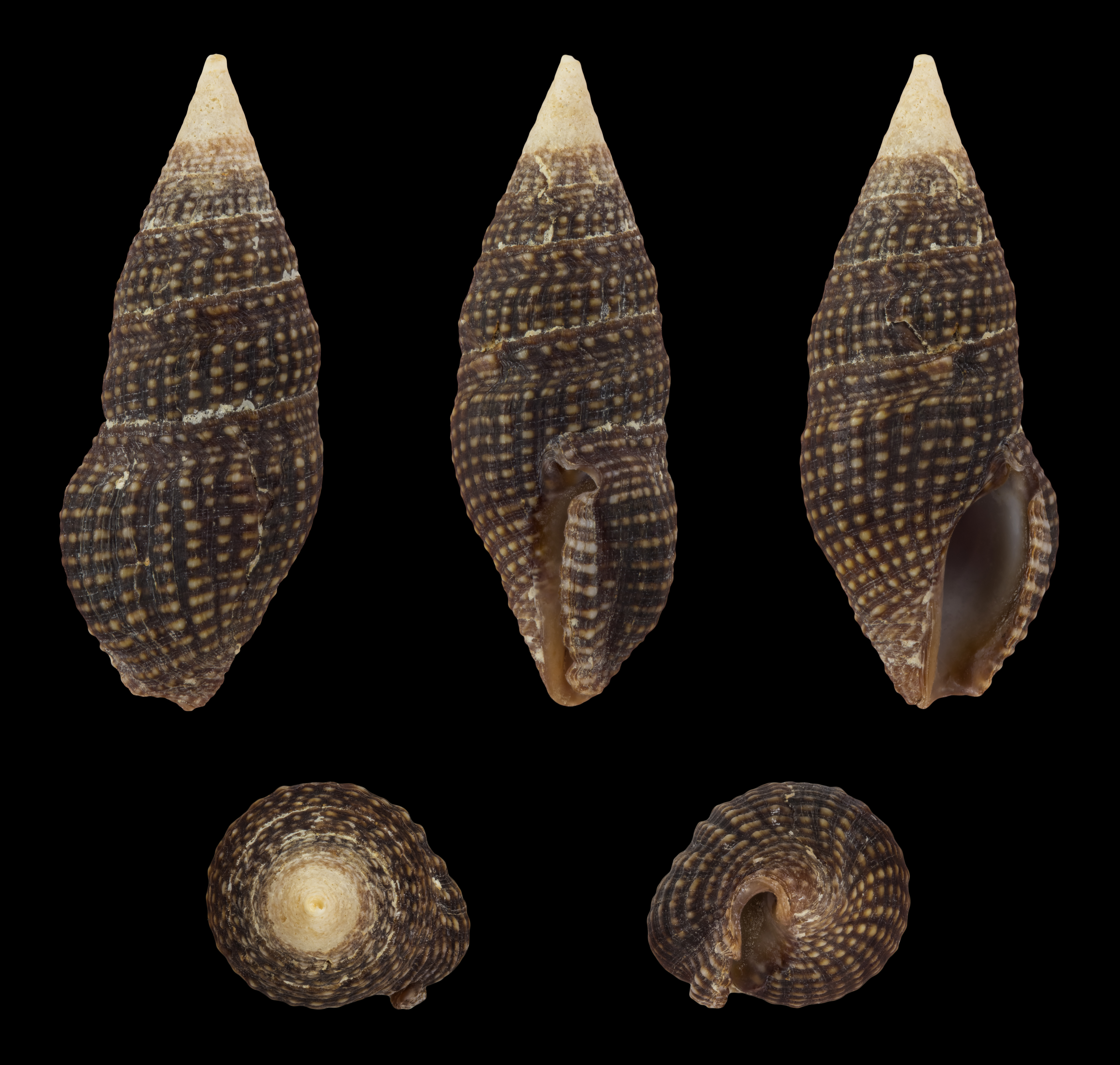
- Shell of Crassispira cerithina

Scientific classification
- Kingdom: Animalia
- Phylum: Mollusca
- Class: Gastropoda
- Subclass: Caenogastropoda
- Order: Neogastropoda
- Superfamily: Conoidea
- Family: Pseudomelatomidae
- Genus: Crassispira
- Species: C. cerithina

Binomial name
- Crassispira cerithina (Anton, 1838)

Synonyms
- Drillia (Crassispira) digitalis (Reeve, 1843); Inquisitor cerithina Kilburn, 1988; Pleurotoma cerithina Anton, 1838 (original combination); Pleurotoma digitale Reeve, 1843; Turridrupa cerithina (Anton, 1838)

= Crassispira cerithina =

Sea snail in the family Pseudomelatomidae

Crassispira cerithina is a species of sea snail, a marine gastropod mollusk in the family Pseudomelatomidae.

Kantor et al. showed in 2017 that this species actually forms a species complex and recognized two new species; Crassispira aurea and Crassispira procera.

== Description ==
The length of the shell varies between 15 mm and 24 mm.

The shell is dark chocolate, covered by rows of lighter colored granulations, caused by the decussation of small flexuous rather numerous longitudinal ribs and elevated revolving lines. The aperture is light chocolate.

== Distribution ==
This marine species occurs in the Indo-Pacific off Mauritius, the Philippines, Japan, the Fiji Islands and off Queensland, Australia.
