= A. afer =

A. afer may refer to:

- Abacetus afer, an African ground beetle
- Afer afer, a West African sea snail
- Anthrax afer, a synonym of Exhyalanthrax afer, a bombyliid fly
- Anthrenus afer, a South African carpet beetle
- Aphomomyrmex afer, an African ant
