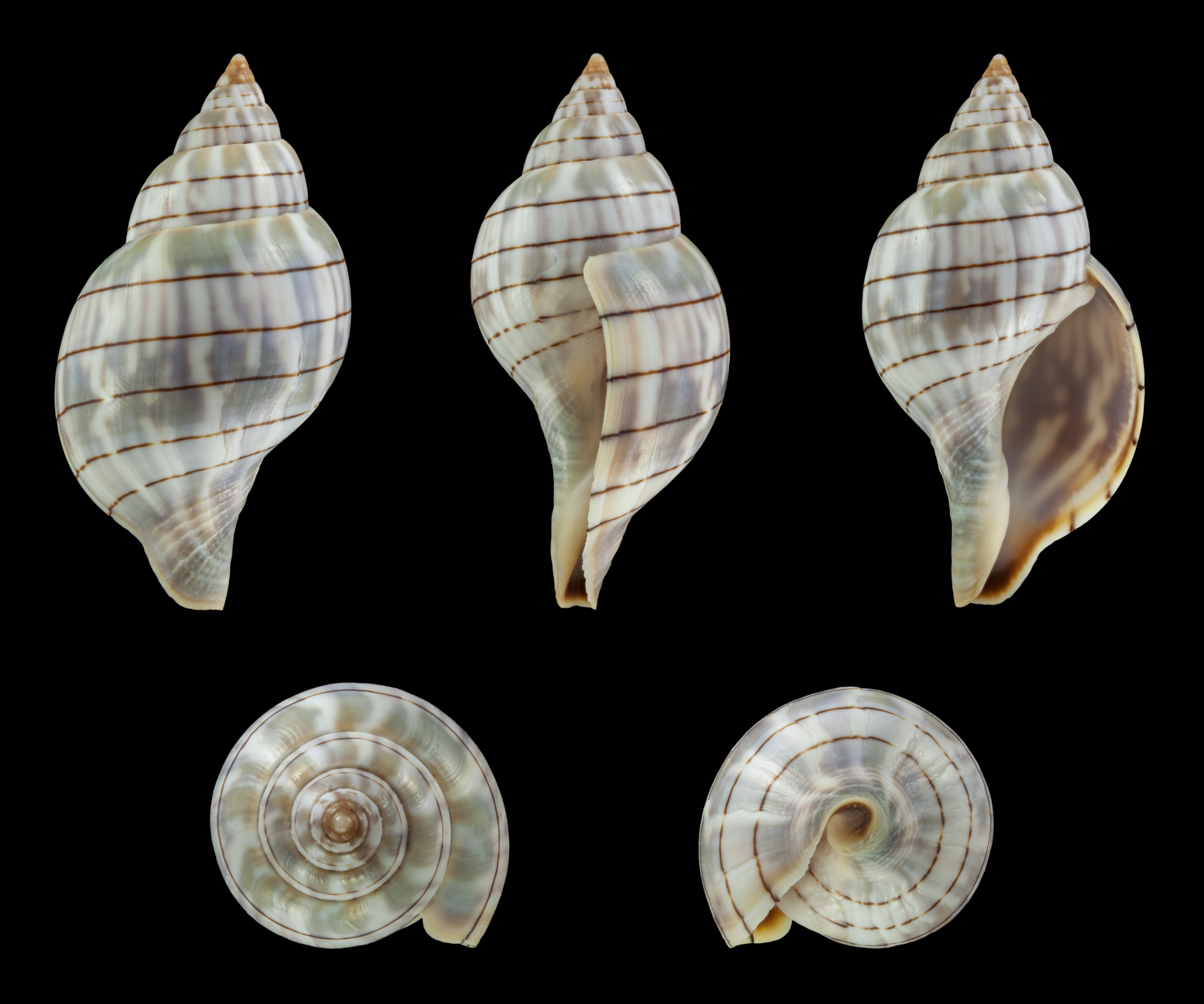
- Shell in five views

Scientific classification
- Kingdom: Animalia
- Phylum: Mollusca
- Class: Gastropoda
- Subclass: Caenogastropoda
- Order: Neogastropoda
- Family: Fasciolariidae
- Genus: Cinctura
- Species: C. hunteria

Binomial name
- Cinctura hunteria (G. Perry, 1811)

Synonyms
- Fasciolaria hunteria (G. Perry, 1811); Fasciolaria lilium tortugana Hollister, 1957; Pyrula hunteria G. Perry, 1811 (basionym)

= Cinctura hunteria =

Species of gastropod

Cinctura hunteria, the northern banded tulip, is a species of sea snail, a marine gastropod mollusk in the family Fasciolariidae, the spindle snails, the tulip snails and their allies.

== Description ==
The shell of Cinctura hunteria exhibits four to seven primary spiral bands.

== Distribution ==
This species occurs in the Caribbean Sea the Gulf of Mexico and the Western Atlantic.

== Ecology ==
Cinctura hunteria is a predator with a diet that includes polychaetes, bivalves, sea squirts, and other snails. For larger prey, it wedges bivalve shells open with the apertural lip of its own shell, which can break the edge of its shell; C. hunteria shells often have repair scars as a result of this damage. When preying on smaller bivalves, C. hunteria envelops the shell and forces open the operculum so that it can insert its proboscis. A large percentage of its diet consists of onuphid worms.

Cinctura hunteria is prey to the larger fasciolariids Fasciolaria tulipa and Triplofusus giganteus. They are also prey to the whitespotted eagle ray Aetobatus narinari.
