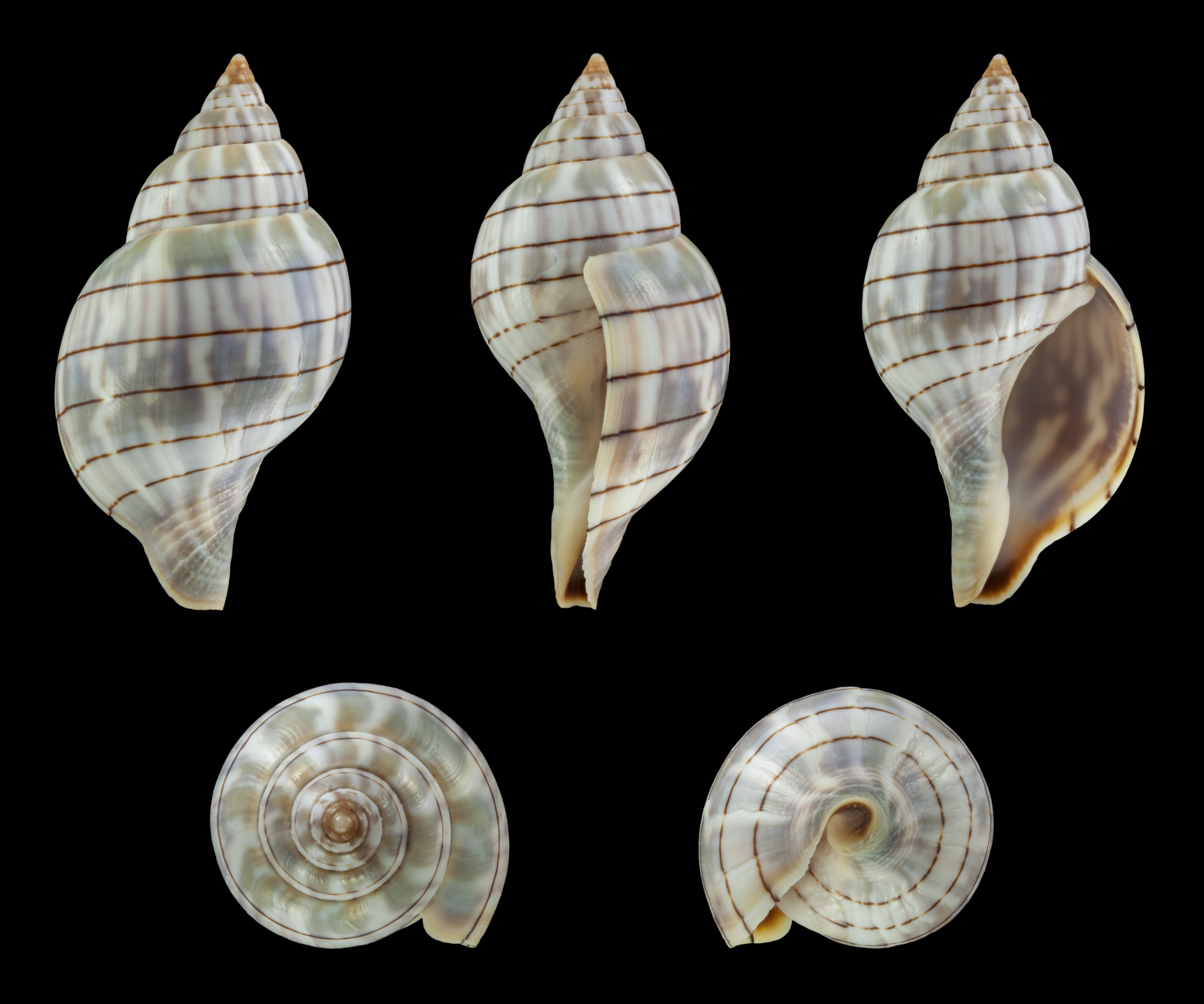
- Shell of Cinctura hunteria

Scientific classification
- Kingdom: Animalia
- Phylum: Mollusca
- Class: Gastropoda
- Subclass: Caenogastropoda
- Order: Neogastropoda
- Family: Fasciolariidae
- Genus: Cinctura; Hollister, 1957

Type species
- Pyrula hunteria G. Perry, 1811

Synonyms
- Cinctura (Cinctura) Hollister, 1957 alternative representation; Cinctura (Hollisteria) Petuch & Berschauer, 2020 alternative representation; Fasciolaria (Cinctura) Hollister, 1957 superseded rank

= Cinctura =

Cinctura Temporal range: Piacenzian–Recent

Genus of gastropods

Cinctura is a genus of fasciolariid sea snails known as the banded tulip shells. Species in this genus were previously grouped in the closely related genus Fasciolaria.

== Taxonomy ==
Cinctura was originally proposed as a subgenus of Fasciolaria in 1957 by Solomon Cady Hollister. It was raised to the rank of genus by Snyder et al. in 2012. Cinctura are known as "banded tulip shells"

== Species ==
Species within the genus Cinctura include:

- Cinctura branhamae (Rehder & Abbott, 1951)
- Cinctura connori Petuch & Berschauer, 2020
- Cinctura hunteria (Perry, 1811)
- Cinctura keatonorum Petuch, 2013
- Cinctura lilium (Fischer von Waldheim, 1807)
- Cinctura salasi Petuch & Berschauer, 2023
- Cinctura tortugana (Hollister, 1957)

== Identification ==
Cinctura differ from the closely related Fasciolaria in bearing a prominent parietal ridge within the aperture of the shell and in lacking an inflected sutural ramp.

== Evolution ==
Cinctura is closely related to Fasciolaria. The earliest known fossils of Cinctura date to the Piacenzian age of the Pliocene.

== Range ==
The range of Cinctura species is restricted to the Gulf of Mexico and off the southeastern United States. No known species, living or extinct, are known from the Caribbean.
