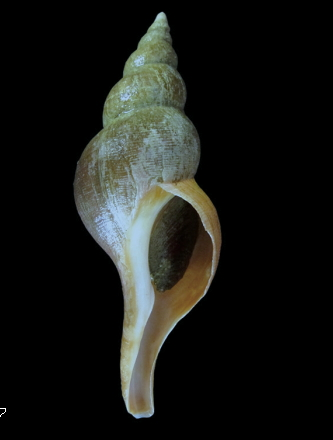
- Shell of Africolaria rutila

Scientific classification
- Kingdom: Animalia
- Phylum: Mollusca
- Class: Gastropoda
- Subclass: Caenogastropoda
- Order: Neogastropoda
- Family: Fasciolariidae
- Subfamily: Fasciolariinae
- Genus: Africolaria; Snyder, Vermeij & Lyons, 2012

Type species
- Fasciolaria rutila Watson, 1882

= Africolaria =

Genus of gastropods

Africolaria is a genus of sea snails, marine gastropod molluscs in the family Fasciolariidae, the spindle snails, the tulip snails and their allies.

== Species ==
Species within the genus Africolaria include:

- Africolaria rutila (Watson, 1882)
- Africolaria thersites (Reeve, 1847)
- Africolaria wattersae (Kilburn, 1974)
