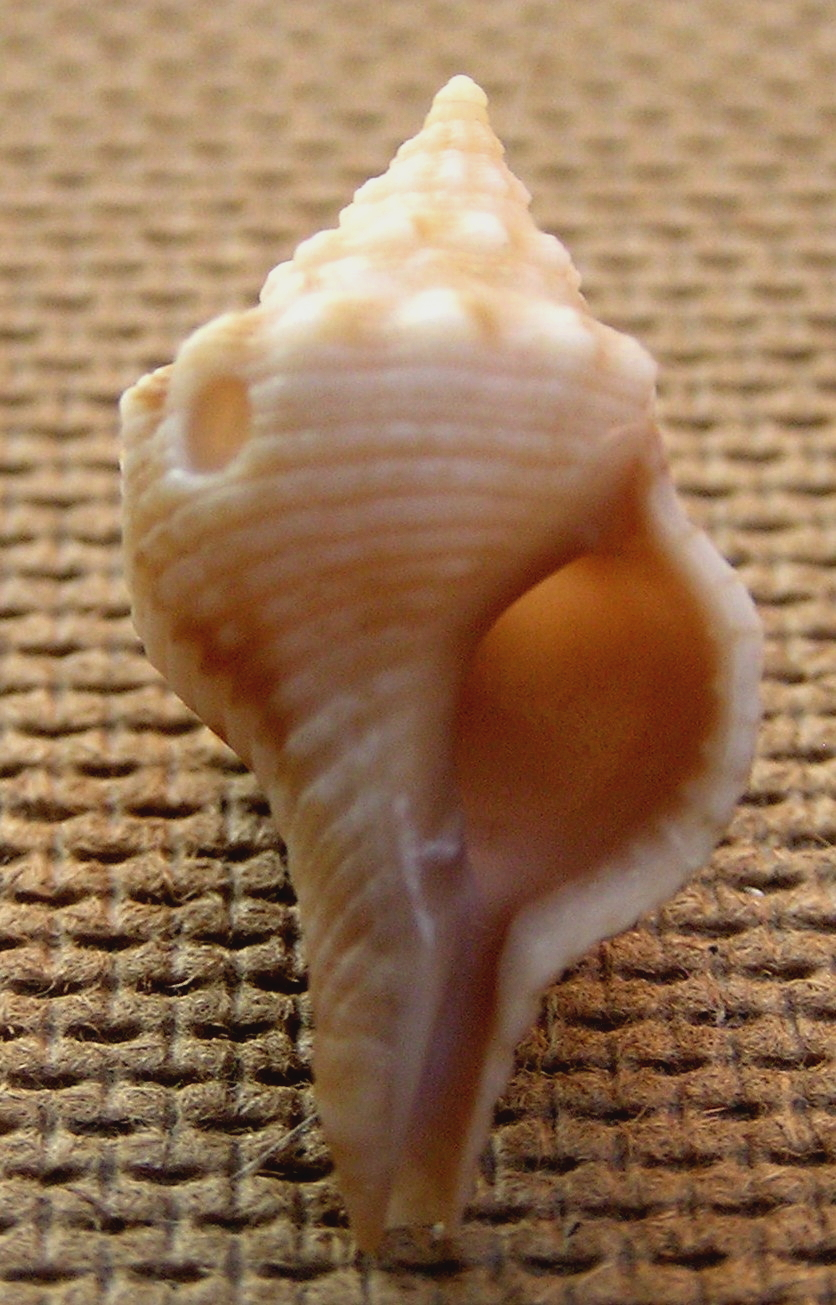
- Shell of Afer lansbergisi

Scientific classification
- Kingdom: Animalia
- Phylum: Mollusca
- Class: Gastropoda
- Subclass: Caenogastropoda
- Order: Neogastropoda
- Family: Tudiclidae
- Genus: Afer
- Species: A. lansbergisi

Binomial name
- Afer lansbergisi Delsaerdt, 1993

= Afer lansbergisi =

Species of gastropod

Afer lansbergisi is a species of large sea snail, marine gastropod mollusc in the family Tudiclidae.

== Description ==
The length of the shell attains 43 mm.

== Distribution ==
This species occurs in the Atlantic Ocean off the Western Sahara.
