= Fasciolaria tephrina =

Scientific classification
- Kingdom: Animalia
- Phylum: Mollusca
- Class: Gastropoda
- Subclass: Caenogastropoda
- Order: Neogastropoda
- Family: Fasciolariidae
- Genus: Fasciolaria
- Species: F. tephrina

Binomial name
- Fasciolaria tephrina De Souza, 2002

Species of gastropod

Fasciolaria tephrina is a species of sea snail, a marine gastropod mollusk in the family Fasciolariidae, the spindle snails, the tulip snails and their allies.
