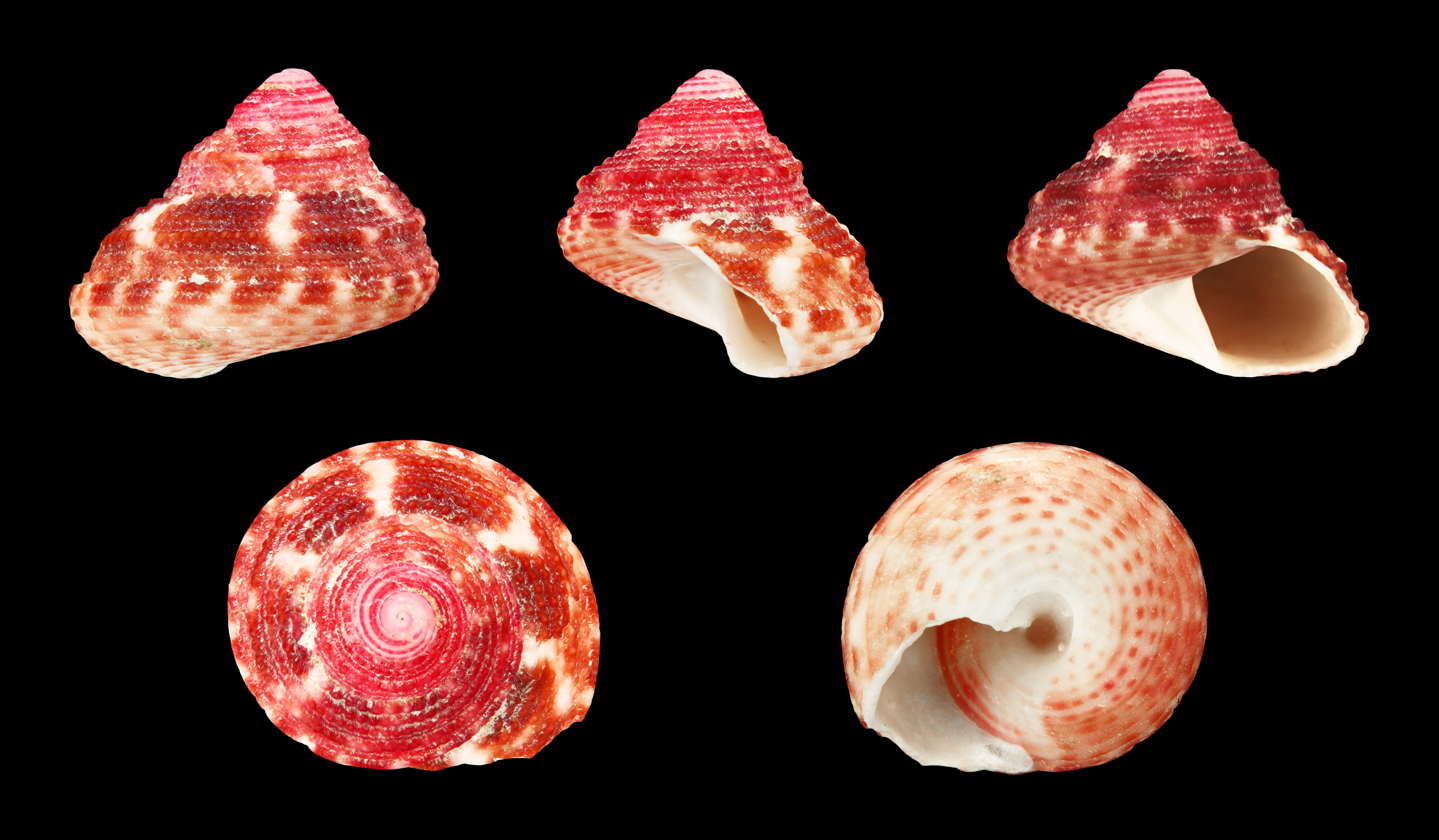

Scientific classification
- Kingdom: Animalia
- Phylum: Mollusca
- Class: Gastropoda
- Subclass: Vetigastropoda
- Order: Trochida
- Superfamily: Trochoidea
- Family: Trochidae
- Genus: Clanculus
- Species: C. miniatus

Binomial name
- Clanculus miniatus (Anton, 1839)

Synonyms
- Clanculus (Clanculopsis) miniatus (Anton, 1838) alternate representation; Clanculus alfredensis Bartsch, 1915; Clanculus becki Turton, 1932; Clanculus carinatus A. Adams, 1853; Clanculus depressus (non Phil.) von Martens, 1874; Clanculus elevatus Turton, 1932; Clanculus eucosmia Turton, 1932; Clanculus kowiensis Turton, 1932; Clanculus laceyi G. B. Sowerby, 1889; Clanculus miniatus carinatus A. Adams, 1853; Clanculus trochiformis Turton, 1932; Gibbula miniata (Anton, 1838); Trochus (Clanculus) depressus Martens, 1874; Trochus (Clanculus) laceyi (G. B. Sowerby, 1889); Trochus depressus Martens, 1874; Trochus laceyi (G. B. Sowerby, 1889); Trochus miniatus Anton, 1839 (original description); Trochus miniatus var. carinatus (A. Adams, 1853)

= Clanculus miniatus =

Species of gastropod

Clanculus miniatus, common name the keeled top shell, is a species of sea snail, a marine gastropod mollusk in the family Trochidae, the top snails.

== Description ==
The height of the shell varies between 12½ mm and 15 mm, its diameter between 15 mm and 17 mm. The conical shell is carinated at the periphery and deeply umbilicated. It is painted with crimson and brown radiating bifurcating stripes above, the apical whorls crimson. The base of the shell is convex, radiately strigate or finely tessellate with brown. The about 6 whorls are subplanulate, but with a slightly salient central carina above. They are spirally finely granose-lirate, the lirae narrow, close, about 8 to 12 in number on the upper surface of the body whorl, the 5th forming a slightly projecting carina. The base is finely lirate, the lirae granose, about 15, subequal, or sometimes alternately smaller with the radiately striate interstices. The aperture is rather large and subrhomboidal. The outer lip is lirate within with a crenulate, expanded base. The long columella is straight, strongly dentate at its base, obsoletely folded above, inserted upon the side of the umbilicus, which is smooth within, bordered by a slight, smooth rib.

In its conical form, densely granose-lirate sculpture and the carina in the middle of the upper surface of the whorls, this form is quite distinct.

== Distribution ==
This marine species occurs off Mozambique and South Africa.
