= Hermann Eduard Anton =

- Born: December 17, 1794; Görlitz
- Died: March 24, 1872 (aged 77); Halle
- Scientific career
- Fields: malacology

Hermann Eduard Anton (17 December 1794, in Görlitz – 24 March 1872, in Halle) was a German malacologist.

== Works ==
- Anton H. E. (1839). Verzeichniss der Conchylien. Halle, xvi + 110 pp.

Some authors consider the work to be published in 1838 while others in 1839.

== Taxa described ==
Taxa described by Hermann Eduard Anton include (sorted chronologically):

1838

- Bonellia obtusa Anton, 1838
- Cardiocardita Anton, 1838
- Clanculus miniatus (Anton, 1838)
- Echinolittorina reticulata (Anton, 1838)
- Eulima dubia Anton, 1838
- Eulima incerta Anton, 1838
- Fasciolaria magna (Anton, 1838)
- Fasciolaria sulcata (Anton, 1838)
- Fusinus indicus (Anton, 1838)
- Isognomon radiatus (Anton, 1838)
- Latirus fenestratus (Anton, 1838)
- Latirus impressus (Anton, 1838)
- Latirus plicatulus (Anton, 1838)
- Monoplex wiegmanni (Anton, 1838)
- Nerita planospira Anton, 1838
- Ostrea imputata Anton, 1838
- Oxystele tigrina (Anton, 1838)
- Oxystele variegata (Anton, 1838)
- Pecten excavatus Anton, 1838
- family Siliquariidae Anton, 1838
- Tectonatica tecta (Anton, 1838)
- Turbinella laevigata Anton, 1838
- Turridrupa cerithina (Anton, 1838)
- Vasum tubiferum (Anton, 1838)
- Vexillum cancellarioides (Anton, 1838)
- Vexillum interruptum (Anton, 1838)
- Vexillum semicostatum (Anton, 1838)

1839

- Asolene pulchella (Anton, 1839)
- Cantharus wagneri (Anton, 1839)
- Pollia wagneri (Anton, 1839)

1848

- Euchelus pullatus Anton, 1848
