= Fasciolaria curvirostris =

Scientific classification
- Kingdom: Animalia
- Phylum: Mollusca
- Class: Gastropoda
- Subclass: Caenogastropoda
- Order: Neogastropoda
- Family: Fasciolariidae
- Genus: Fasciolaria
- Species: F. curvirostris

Binomial name
- Fasciolaria curvirostris (Wood, 1828)

Synonyms
- Murex curvirostris Wood, 1828

Species of gastropod

Fasciolaria curvirostris is a species of sea snail, a marine gastropod mollusk in the family Fasciolariidae, the spindle snails, the tulip snails and their allies.
