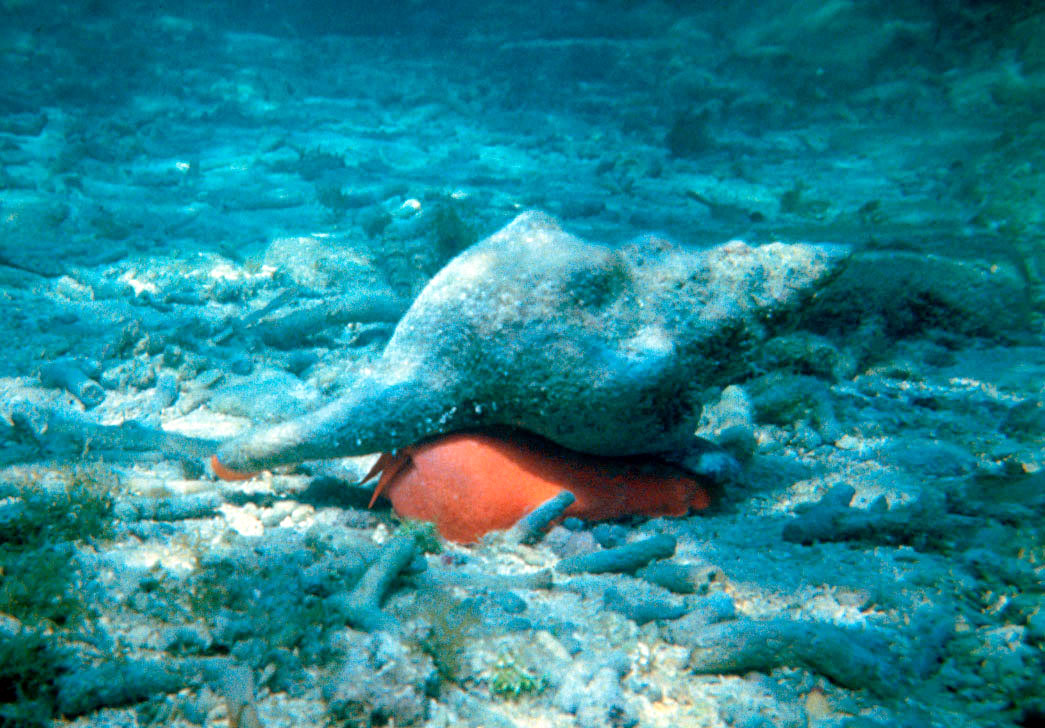
- Triplofusus papillosus

Scientific classification
- Kingdom: Animalia
- Phylum: Mollusca
- Class: Gastropoda
- Subclass: Caenogastropoda
- Order: Neogastropoda
- Family: Fasciolariidae
- Subfamily: Fasciolariinae
- Genus: Triplofusus; Olsson & Harbison, 1953

Type species
- Fasciolaria gigantea Kiener, 1840

= Triplofusus =

Genus of gastropods

Triplofusus is a genus of sea snails, marine gastropod mollusks in the family Fasciolariidae, the spindle snails, the tulip snails and their allies.

== Species ==
Species within the genus Triplofusus include:

- Triplofusus giganteus (Kiener, 1840)
- Triplofusus princeps (G.B. Sowerby I, 1825)

Species brought into synonymy

- Triplofusus papillosus auct.: synonym of Triplofusus giganteus (Kiener, 1840)
- Triplofusus papillosus (G.B. Sowerby I, 1825) (Original name, Fasciolaria papillosa, is a nomen dubium.)
