= Fasciolaria bullisi =

Scientific classification
- Kingdom: Animalia
- Phylum: Mollusca
- Class: Gastropoda
- Subclass: Caenogastropoda
- Order: Neogastropoda
- Family: Fasciolariidae
- Genus: Fasciolaria
- Species: F. bullisi

Binomial name
- Fasciolaria bullisi Lyons, 1972

Species of sea snail

Fasciolaria bullisi is a species of sea snail, a marine gastropod mollusk in the family Fasciolariidae, the spindle snails, the tulip snails and their allies.

== Description ==
The species attains a size of 160 mm.

== Distribution ==
Sometimes trawled at 300 ft depths, off the East coast of Mexico.
