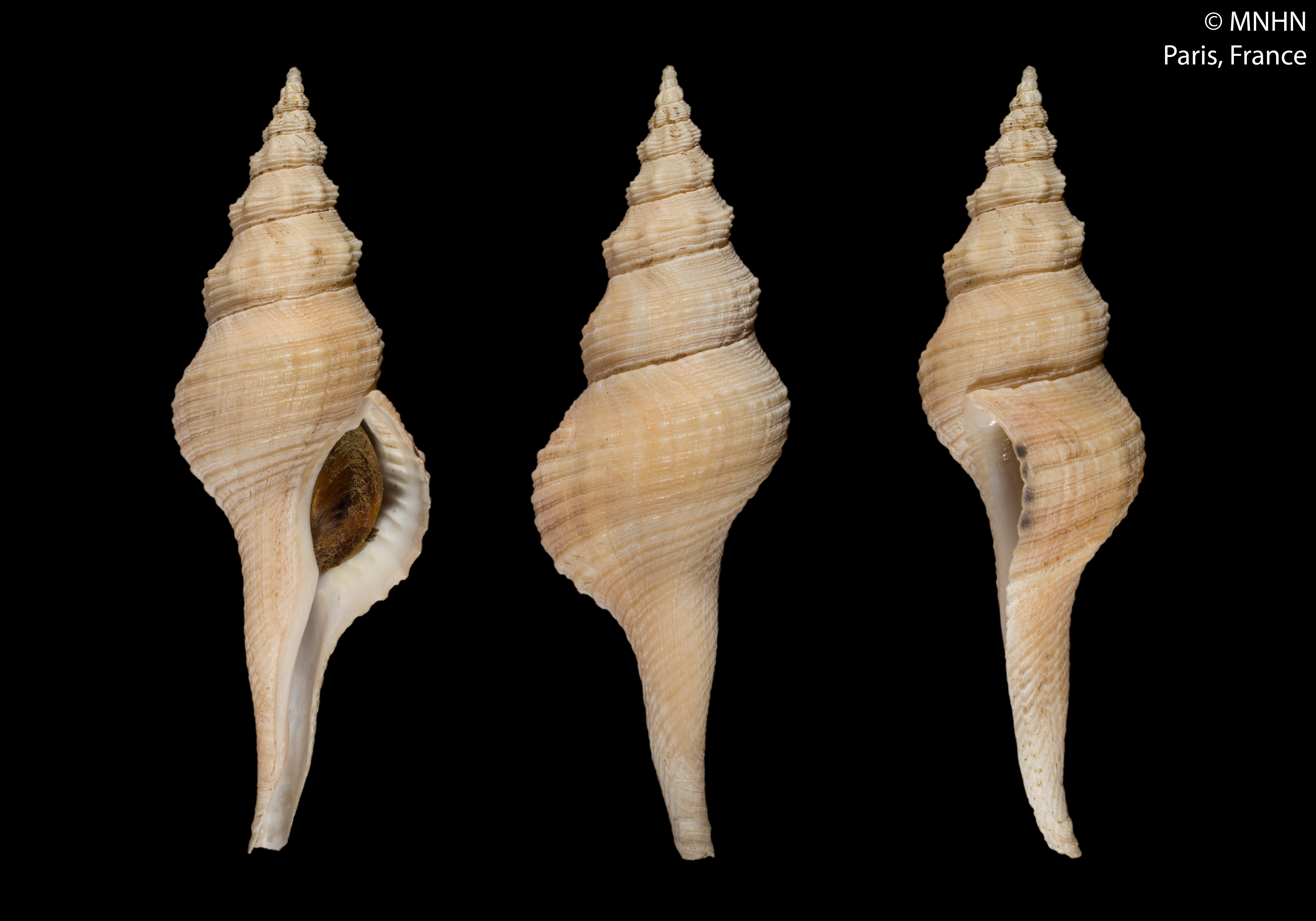
- Shell of Afer pseudofusinus (holotype at MNHN, Paris)

Scientific classification
- Kingdom: Animalia
- Phylum: Mollusca
- Class: Gastropoda
- Subclass: Caenogastropoda
- Order: Neogastropoda
- Family: Tudiclidae
- Genus: Afer
- Species: A. pseudofusinus

Binomial name
- Afer pseudofusinus Fraussen & Hadorn, 2000

= Afer pseudofusinus =

Species of gastropod

Afer pseudofusinus is a species of large sea snail, marine gastropod mollusc in the family Tudiclidae.

== Description ==
The length of the shell attains 57 mm.

== Distribution ==
This species occurs in the Atlantic Ocean off Senegal, Mauritania, Guinea-Bissau, Ivory Coast and Angola.
