= Eulima dubia =

Scientific classification
- Kingdom: Animalia
- Phylum: Mollusca
- Class: Gastropoda
- Subclass: Caenogastropoda
- Order: Littorinimorpha
- Family: Eulimidae
- Genus: Eulima
- Species: E. dubia

Binomial name
- Eulima dubia Anton, 1838

Species of gastropod

Eulima dubia is a species of sea snail, a marine gastropod mollusk in the family Eulimidae. The species is one of a number within the genus Eulima.

This is a taxon inquirendum as Melania (Eulima) dubia Anton, 1838
