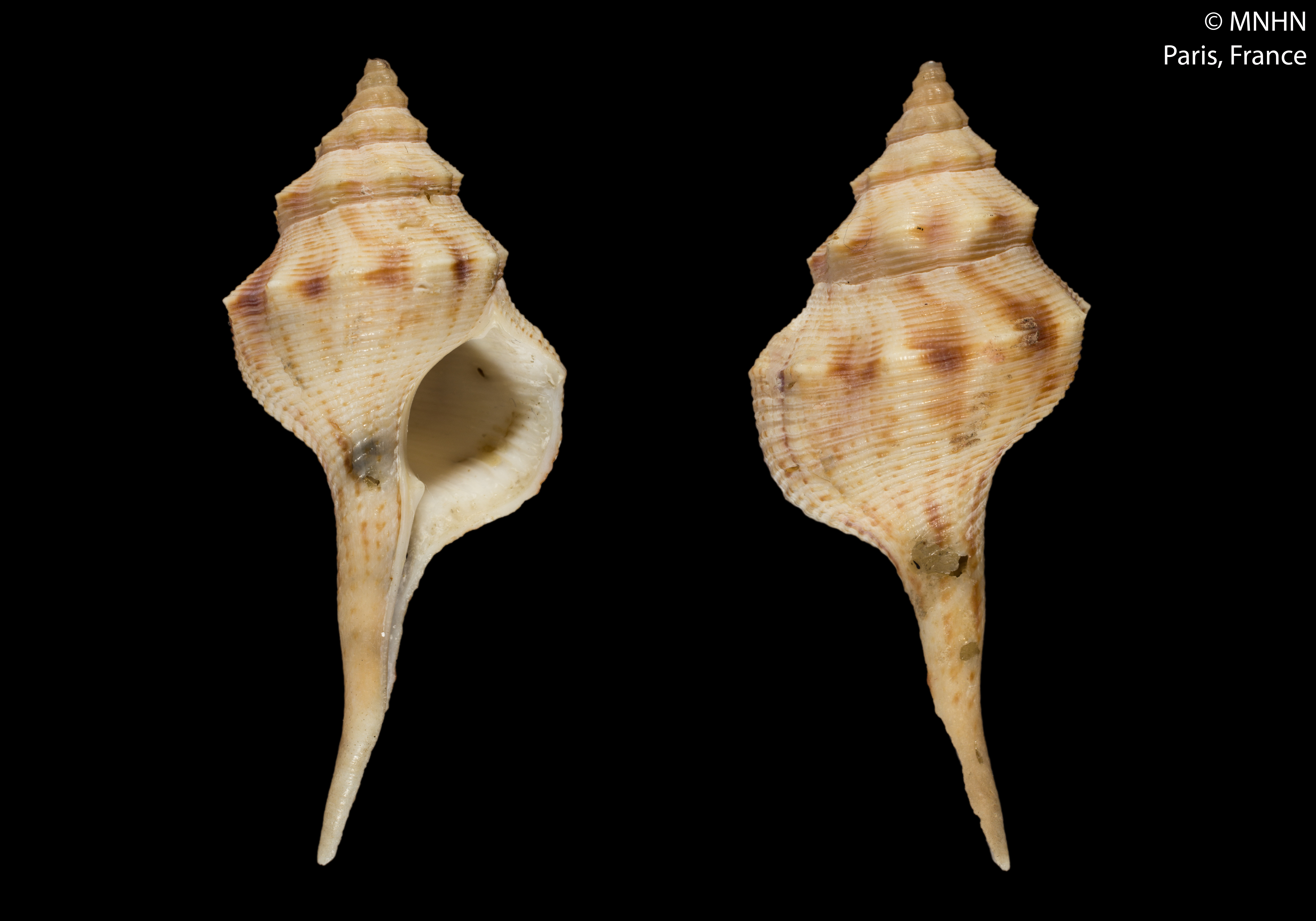
- Shell of Afer cumingii (syntype at MNHN, Paris))

Scientific classification
- Kingdom: Animalia
- Phylum: Mollusca
- Class: Gastropoda
- Subclass: Caenogastropoda
- Order: Neogastropoda
- Family: Tudiclidae
- Genus: Afer
- Species: A. cumingii

Binomial name
- Afer cumingii (Reeve, 1848)

Synonyms
- Fusus couderti Petit de la Saussaye, 1853; Fusus cumingii Reeve, 1848 (basionym)

= Afer cumingii =

Species of gastropod

Afer cumingii is a species of large sea snail, marine gastropod mollusc in the family Tudiclidae.

== Description ==
The length of the shell attains 65 mm, its diameter 30 mm.

(Original description of Fusus couderti in French) The ventricose shell is whitish, marked with irregular ferruginous-brown spots. It features high, fairly acute whorls, totaling eight, each elegantly furrowed and presenting a series of depressed tubercles that form a keel-like structure. The oval-rounded aperture on the right side has crenellations that extend quite far into the interior. The callous columella is furnished at its base with a thick, dentiform fold. The lower end of the shell tapers into a fairly long tail that curves slightly backward at the extremity.

== Distribution ==
This marine species occurs off Taiwan.
