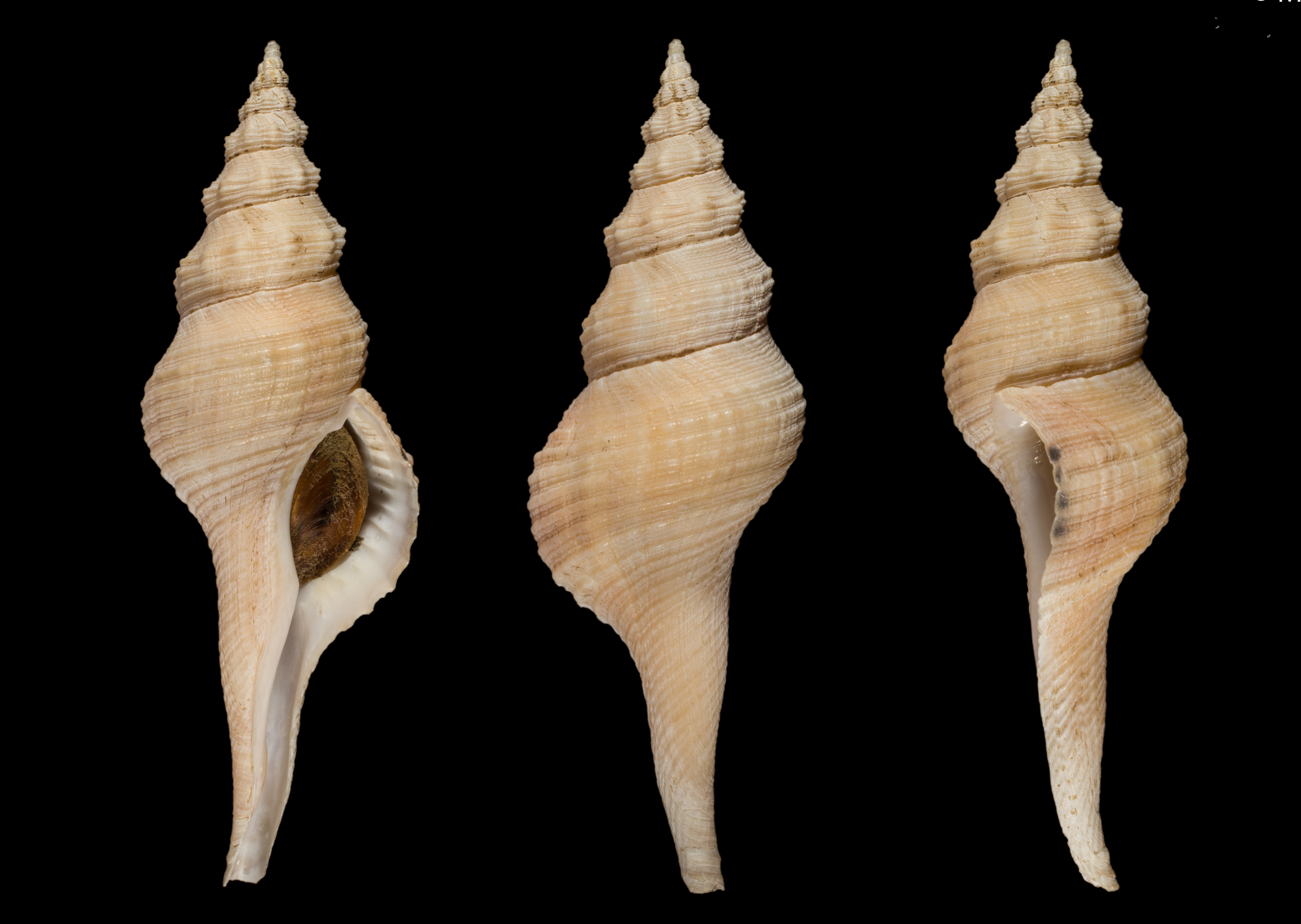
- Shell of Afer pseudofusinus (holotype in MNHN, Paris)

Scientific classification
- Kingdom: Animalia
- Phylum: Mollusca
- Class: Gastropoda
- Subclass: Caenogastropoda
- Order: Neogastropoda
- Family: Tudiclidae
- Genus: Afer; Conrad, 1858

Type species
- Murex afer Gmelin, 1791

Species
- See text

Synonyms
- Afer (Streptosiphon) Gill, 1867 ·; Fusus (Afer) Conrad, 1858 (original rank); Streptosiphon Gill, 1867

= Afer (gastropod) =

Genus of gastropods

Afer is a genus of sea snails, marine gastropod mollusks in the family Tudiclidae.

== Species ==
Species within the genus Afer include:

- Afer afer (Gmelin, 1791)
- Afer cumingii (Reeve, 1848)
- Afer echinatus Fraussen, 2008
- Afer ignifer Fraussen & Trencart, 2008
- Afer lansbergisi Delsaerdt, 1993
- † Afer macrospira (Cossmann, 1903)
- † Afer orangensis (Beets, 1942)
- Afer porphyrostoma (Reeve, 1847)
- Afer pseudofusinus Fraussen & Hadorn, 2000
- Afer trauseli Thach, 2023
- † Afer uhli Traub, 1979

Species brought into synonymy

- Afer africanus (Sowerby III, 1897): synonym of Africofusus africanus (G. B. Sowerby III, 1897) (superseded combination)
- Afer chinensis MacNeil, 1960: synonym of Siphonofusus chinensis (MacNeil, 1960)
- † Afer wanneri (Beets, 1942): synonym of † Euthria wanneri (Beets, 1942)
