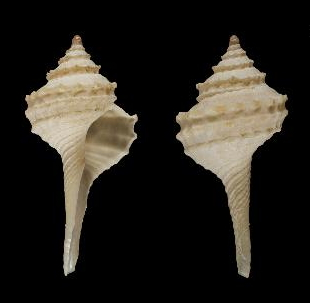
- Shell of Afer echinatus (holotype at MNHN, Paris)

Scientific classification
- Kingdom: Animalia
- Phylum: Mollusca
- Class: Gastropoda
- Subclass: Caenogastropoda
- Order: Neogastropoda
- Family: Tudiclidae
- Genus: Afer
- Species: A. echinatus

Binomial name
- Afer echinatus Fraussen, 2008

= Afer echinatus =

Species of gastropod

Afer echinatus is a species of large sea snail, a marine gastropod in the family Tudiclidae.

== Description ==
Afer echinatus is a species of large sea snail, with a length of approximately 26.7 mm. The Tudiclidae family of marine gastropods is known for its thick and often ornate shells. The name "echinatus" refers to the shell's spiny texture. Members of the Afer genus, including Afer echinatus, are found in marine environments, often in areas with rocky or sandy seafloor habitats, where they prey on smaller marine creatures. This diet is typical for species in the Buccinidae family, which includes other carnivorous snails like the knobbed whelk. They use their strong, specialized radula (a tongue-like structure with teeth) to scrape and feed on their prey.

== Distribution ==
This species occurs in the Atlantic Ocean from Morocco and Mauritania to Senegal.
