= Kilburnia =

Scientific classification
- Kingdom: Animalia
- Phylum: Mollusca
- Class: Gastropoda
- Subclass: Caenogastropoda
- Order: Neogastropoda
- Family: Fasciolariidae
- Subfamily: Fasciolariinae
- Genus: Kilburnia

Type species
- Fasciolaria heynemanni Dunker, 1876

Genus of gastropods

Kilburnia is a genus of sea snails, marine gastropod mollusks in the family Fasciolariidae, the spindle snails, the tulip snails and their allies.

== Species ==
Species within the genus Kilburnia include:

- Kilburnia emmae R. Aiken & Seccombe, 2019
- Kilburnia heynemanni (Dunker, 1870)
- Kilburnia scholvieni (Strebel, 1911)

Synonyms

- Kilburnia agulhasensis (Tomlin, 1932): synonym of Kilburnia scholvieni (Strebel, 1912)
- Kilburnia alfredensis (Bartsch, 1915): synonym of Kilburnia scholvieni (Strebel, 1912)
- Kilburnia dunkeri (Strebel, 1911): synonym of Kilburnia heynemanni (Dunker, 1876)
- Kilburnia strebeli (Fulton, 1930): synonym of Kilburnia heynemanni (Dunker, 1876)
