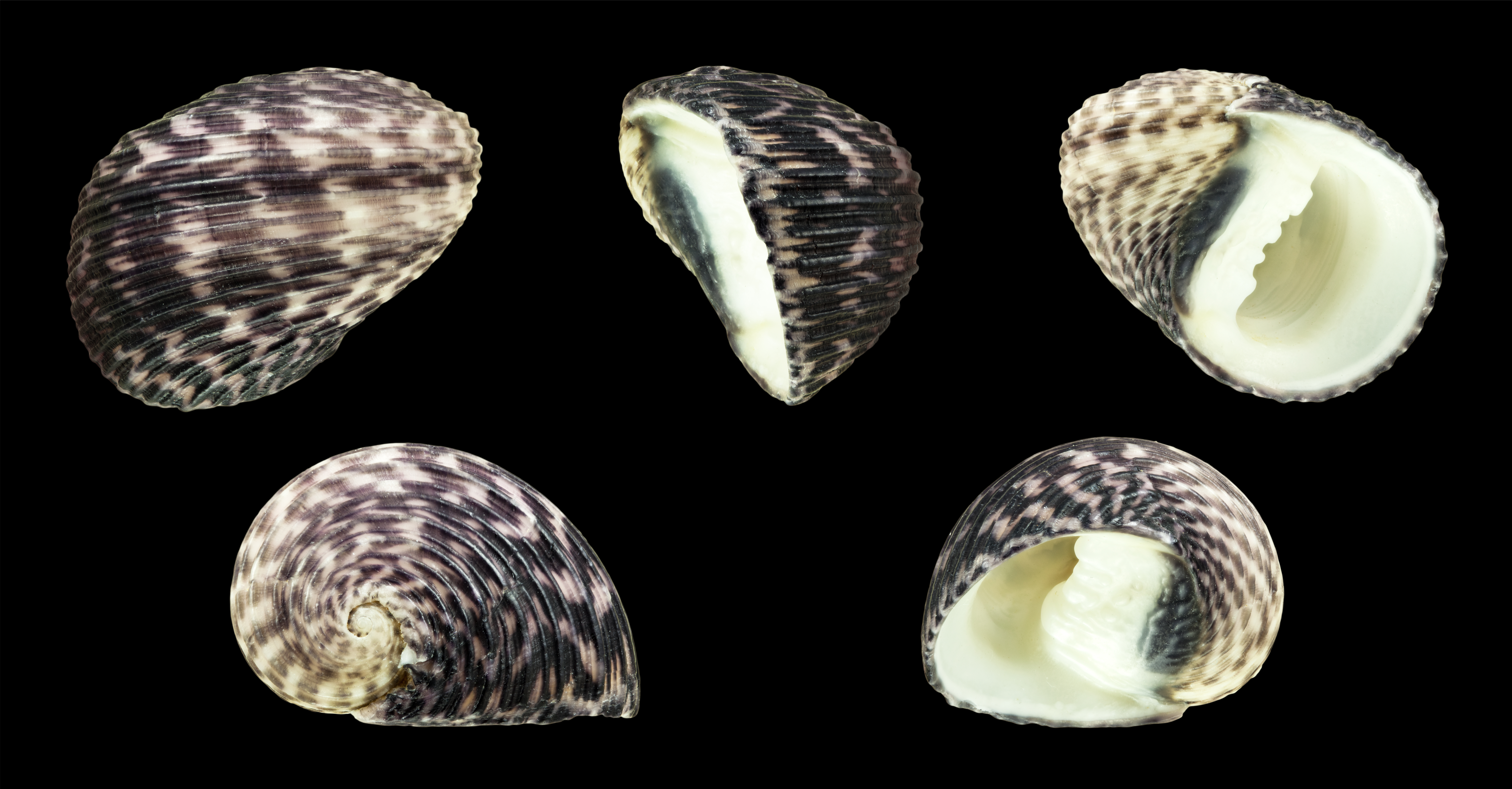

Scientific classification
- Kingdom: Animalia
- Phylum: Mollusca
- Class: Gastropoda
- Order: Cycloneritida
- Family: Neritidae
- Genus: Nerita
- Species: N. planospira

Binomial name
- Nerita planospira Anton, 1839

Synonyms
- Nerita (Ilynerita) planospira Anton, 1838· accepted, alternate representation; Nerita (Theliostyla) planospira Anton, 1838· accepted, alternate representation (new combination); Nerita angularis Hombron & Jacquinot, 1848 (unavailable; a junior homonym of Nerita angularis O.F. Mueller, 1774); Nerita atropurpurea Récluz, 1841

= Nerita planospira =

Species of gastropod

Nerita planospira is a species of sea snail, a marine gastropod mollusk in the family Neritidae.

== Description ==
The shell is cream and mottled black in color with an inner surface of the flat-spired nerite smooth and white. It has a toothed shelf protecting the entrance. The outer surface is thick and roughly ridged, and tightly coiled.

== Distribution ==
This marine species occurs off Papua New Guinea
