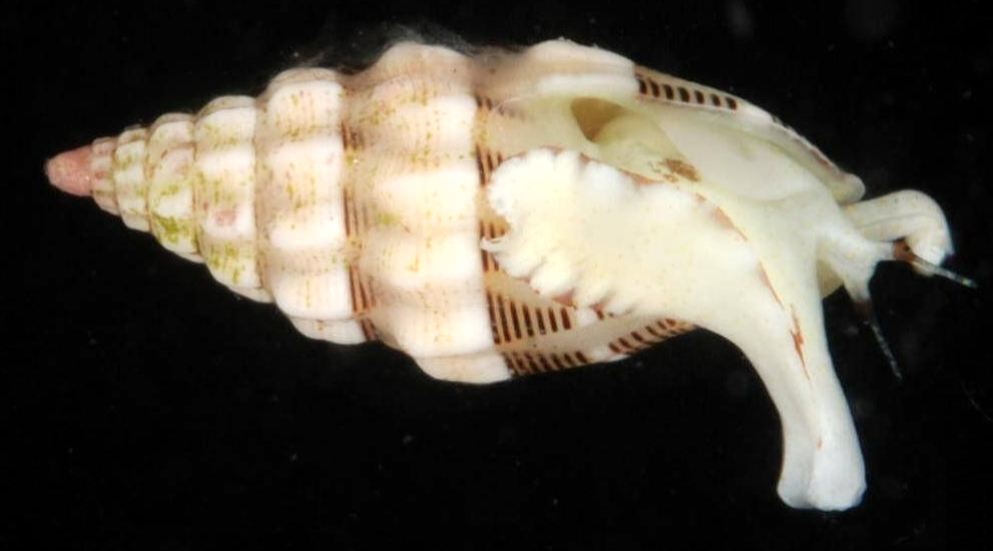
- Vexillum interruptum (specimen at the Smithsonian Institution)

Scientific classification
- Kingdom: Animalia
- Phylum: Mollusca
- Class: Gastropoda
- Subclass: Caenogastropoda
- Order: Neogastropoda
- Superfamily: Turbinelloidea
- Family: Costellariidae
- Genus: Vexillum
- Species: V. interruptum

Binomial name
- Vexillum interruptum (Anton, 1838)

Synonyms
- Mitra cimelium Reeve, 1845; Mitra interrupta Anton, 1838 (original combination); Turricula (Pusia) nodulosa Pease, 1868; Vexillum (Costellaria) interruptum (Anton, 1838); Vexillum (Pusia) interruptum (Anton, 1838)

= Vexillum interruptum =

Species of gastropod

Vexillum interruptum is a species of small sea snail, marine gastropod mollusk in the family Costellariidae, the ribbed miters.

== Description ==
The length of the shell varies between 6 mm and 7 mm.

(Described as Turricula (Pusia) nodulosa) The thick shell is oblong ovate. It is longitudinally nodosely ribbed. The ribs are round, prominent, remote, somewhat oblique and curved, on the spire and upper part of the body whorl swollen, becoming obsolete on the lower part of the body whorl, transversely encircled with close set elevated striae. The whorls are rounded. The spire is turrited. The columella is four-plaited and slightly callous at top. The shell is white; the striae on the lower half of the whorls are reddish-chestnut.

== Distribution ==
This species occurs in the South Pacific Ocean off the Society Islands, the Solomon Islands, the Tuamotus, Mariana Islands, Hawaii; also off the Philippines and New Caledonia.
