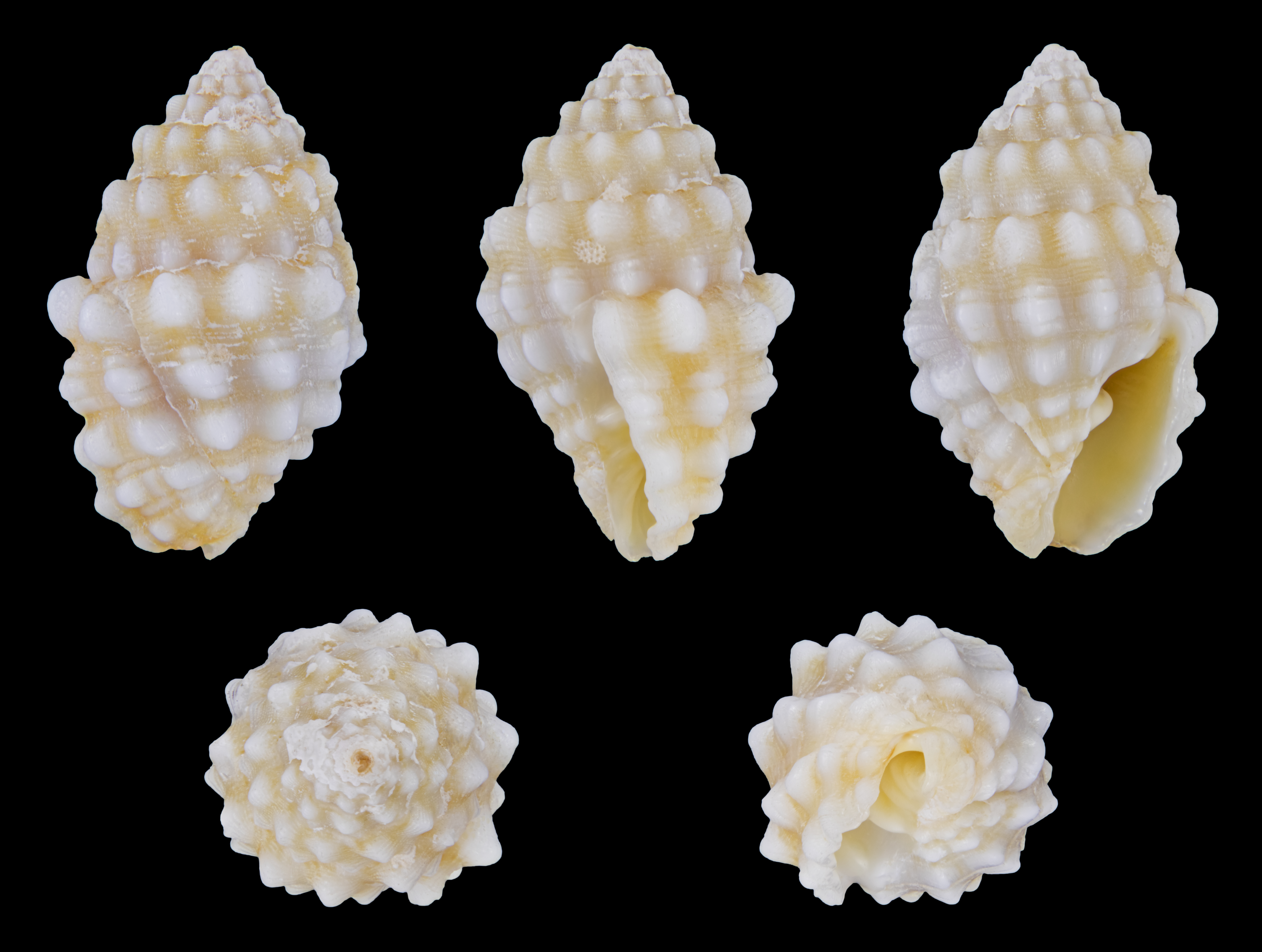

Scientific classification
- Kingdom: Animalia
- Phylum: Mollusca
- Class: Gastropoda
- Subclass: Caenogastropoda
- Order: Neogastropoda
- Family: Costellariidae
- Genus: Vexillum
- Species: V. cancellarioides

Binomial name
- Vexillum cancellarioides (Anton, 1838)

Synonyms
- Mitra cancellarioides Anton, 1838 · unaccepted (original combination); Mitra fraga Kiener, L.C., 1838 (not Quoy & Gaimard, 1833); Mitra tuberculata Kiener, L.C., 1839; Mitra nodosa Reeve, L.A., 1844; Mitra pinguis Reeve, L.A., 1845; Pusia cancellarioides (Anton, 1838); Vexillum (Pusia) cancellarioides (Anton, 1838)

= Vexillum cancellarioides =

Species of gastropod

Vexillum cancellarioides, common name the cancellaria mitre, is a species of small sea snail, marine gastropod mollusk in the family Costellariidae, the ribbed miters.

== Description ==
The shell size of this species varies between 13 mm and 25 mm, comparable to the length of average human fingernail. Its shell may have any color range from cream white to light brown.

The shell is white, sometimes with a central brown band or a row of spots interrupted by the tubercles, which cover the entire surface. The upper part of the bodywhorl shows close impressed revolving striae. The aperture is yellowish within.

== Distribution ==
This species occurs in the Red Sea, the Indian Ocean off the Aldabra Atoll and the Mascarene Basin, and in the Western Pacific; off Australia (New South Wales, Queensland).
