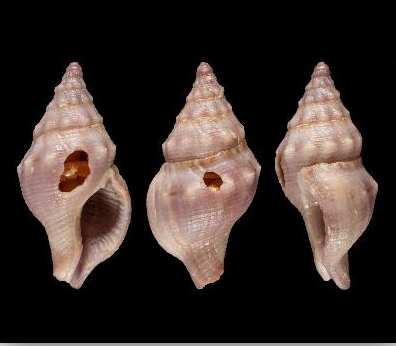
- Shell of Afer ignifer (holotype at MNHN, Paris)

Scientific classification
- Kingdom: Animalia
- Phylum: Mollusca
- Class: Gastropoda
- Subclass: Caenogastropoda
- Order: Neogastropoda
- Family: Tudiclidae
- Genus: Afer
- Species: A. ignifer

Binomial name
- Afer ignifer Fraussen & Trencart, 2008

Synonyms
- Afer (Streptosiphon) ignifer Fraussen & Trencart, 2008 ·

= Afer ignifer =

Species of gastropod

Afer ignifer is a species of large sea snail, marine gastropod mollusc in the family Tudiclidae.

== Description ==
The shell of Afner ignifer features a triangular crest, down to a hollow, less dense bottom.

== Distribution ==
This marine species occurs off Senegal.
