= Afer trauseli =

Scientific classification
- Kingdom: Animalia
- Phylum: Mollusca
- Class: Gastropoda
- Subclass: Caenogastropoda
- Order: Neogastropoda
- Family: Tudiclidae
- Genus: Afer
- Species: A. trauseli

Binomial name
- Afer trauseli Thach, 2023

Species of gastropod

Afer trauseli is a species of large sea snail, marine gastropod mollusc in the family Tudiclidae.

== Distribution ==
This species occurs off Vietnam.
