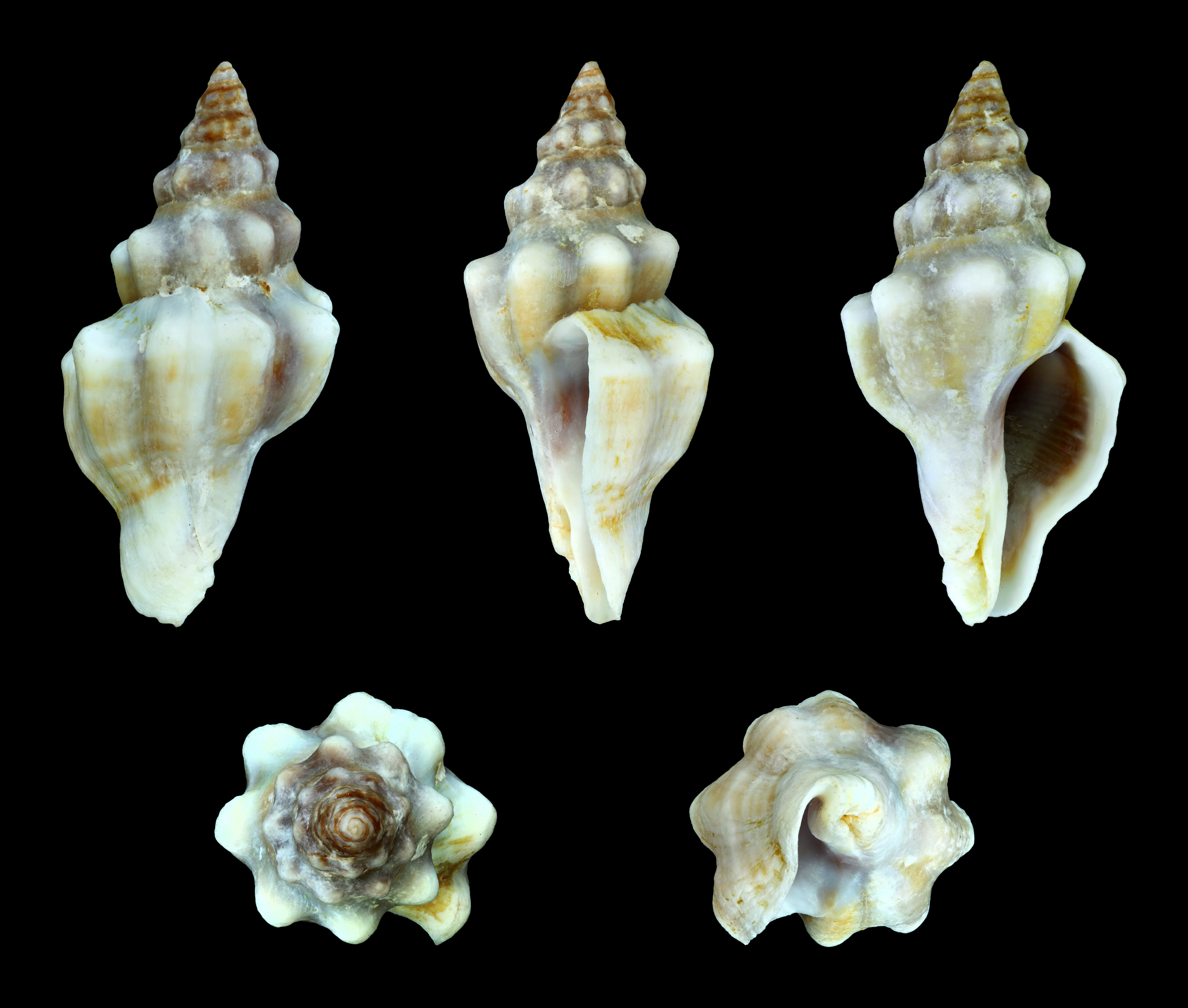
- Tarantinaea lignaria shell

Scientific classification
- Kingdom: Animalia
- Phylum: Mollusca
- Class: Gastropoda
- Subclass: Caenogastropoda
- Order: Neogastropoda
- Superfamily: Buccinoidea
- Family: Fasciolariidae
- Genus: Tarantinaea; Monterosato, 1917

Type species
- Murex lignarius A. Adams, 1853

= Tarantinaea =

Genus of gastropods

Tarantinaea is a genus of sea snails, marine gastropod mollusks in the family Fasciolariidae, the spindle snails, the tulip snails and their allies.

== Species ==
Species within the genus Tarantinaea include:

- † Tarantinaea fimbriata (Brocchi, 1814)
- † Tarantinaea hoernesii (Seguenza, 1875)
- Tarantinaea lignaria (Linnaeus, 1758)
