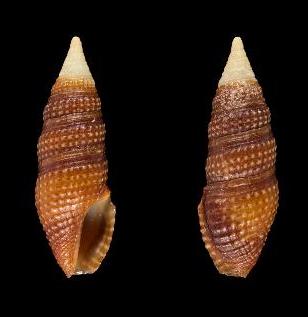
- Shells of Crassispira procera (museum specimens at MNHN, Paris)

Scientific classification
- Kingdom: Animalia
- Phylum: Mollusca
- Class: Gastropoda
- Subclass: Caenogastropoda
- Order: Neogastropoda
- Superfamily: Conoidea
- Family: Pseudomelatomidae
- Genus: Crassispira
- Species: C. procera

Binomial name
- Crassispira procera Kantor, Stahlschmidt, Aznar-Cormano, Bouchet & Puillandre, 2017

= Crassispira procera =

Species of gastropod

Crassispira procera is a species of sea snail, a marine gastropod mollusk in the family Pseudomelatomidae.

== Description ==
The length of the shell attains 15 mm.

== Distribution ==
This marine species occurs off the Chesterfield Plateau, New Caledonia, the Coral Sea and the Philippines.
