= Africolaria wattersae =

Scientific classification
- Kingdom: Animalia
- Phylum: Mollusca
- Class: Gastropoda
- Subclass: Caenogastropoda
- Order: Neogastropoda
- Family: Fasciolariidae
- Genus: Africolaria
- Species: A. wattersae

Binomial name
- Africolaria wattersae (Kilburn, 1974)

Synonyms
- Fasciolaria (Pleuroploca) wattersae Kilburn, 1974 (basionym); Fasciolaria wattersae Kilburn, 1974; Pleuroploca wattersae (Kilburn, 1974)

Species of gastropod

Africolaria wattersae is a species of sea snail, a marine gastropod mollusk in the family Fasciolariidae, the spindle snails, the tulip snails and their allies.

== Distribution ==
This marine species occurs off South Africa.
