= Cinctura branhamae =

Scientific classification
- Kingdom: Animalia
- Phylum: Mollusca
- Class: Gastropoda
- Subclass: Caenogastropoda
- Order: Neogastropoda
- Family: Fasciolariidae
- Genus: Cinctura
- Species: C. branhamae

Binomial name
- Cinctura branhamae (Rehder & Abbott, 1951)

Synonyms
- Fasciolaria branhamae Rehder & Abbott, 1951; Fasciolaria distans branhamae Rehder & Abbott, 1951; Fasciolaria lilium branhamae Rehder & Abbott, 1951

Species of gastropod

Cinctura branhamae is a species of sea snail, a marine gastropod mollusk in the family Fasciolariidae, the spindle snails, the tulip snails and their allies.

== Distribution ==
This species occurs in the Gulf of Mexico.
