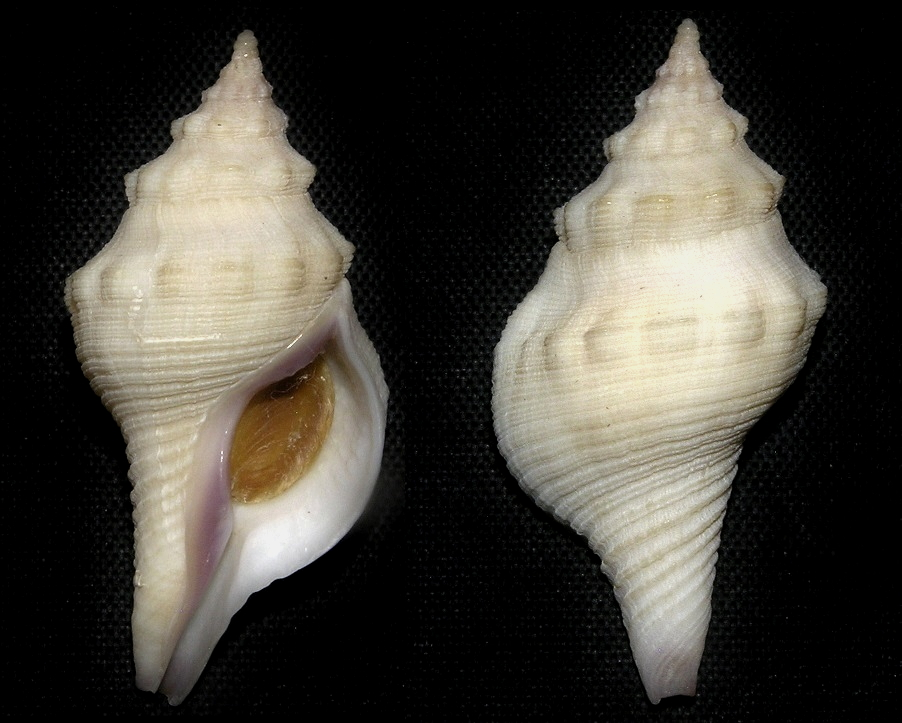
- Shell of Afer porphyrostoma

Scientific classification
- Kingdom: Animalia
- Phylum: Mollusca
- Class: Gastropoda
- Subclass: Caenogastropoda
- Order: Neogastropoda
- Family: Tudiclidae
- Genus: Afer
- Species: A. porphyrostoma

Binomial name
- Afer porphyrostoma (Reeve, 1847)
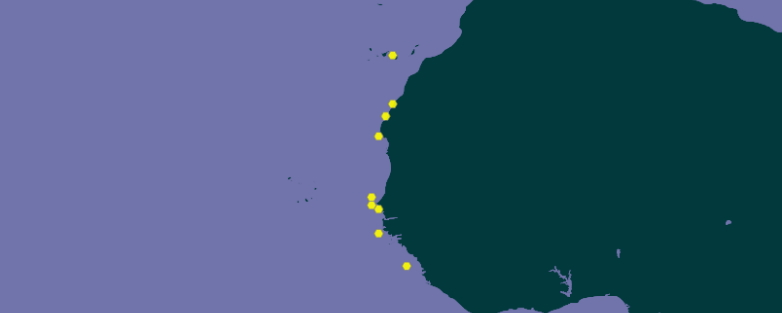

Synonyms
- Fasciolaria porphyrostoma Reeve, 1847 (original combination); Tudicla recurva A. Adams, 1855 junior subjective synonym

= Afer porphyrostoma =

Species of gastropod

Afer porphyrostoma is a species of large sea snail, marine gastropod mollusc in the family Tudiclidae.

== Description ==
The length of the shell attains 45 mm.

(Original description in Latin of Tudicla recurva) The shell is fusiform and tawny, adorned with transverse threads and rufescent tones. It features an acuminate spire and a mamillate protoconch. The whorls are transversely grooved and excavated above, with a single series of nodules in the middle. The oval aperture is violaceous inside, with a calloused columella that is anteriorly lined with oblique plicae. It has a long, very recurved siphonal canal and a sharp outer lip with a sinuous margin. The interior of the outer lip is lirated.

In this species the whorls are encircled with a series of nodules. The columella is smooth and callous, the siphonal canal strongly recurved, and the interior of the aperture is of a delicate violet colour.

== Distribution ==
This species occurs in the Atlantic Ocean off Morocco, the Western Sahara, Senegal, Cape Verde and Guinea
