= Turbinella tuberculata =

Scientific classification
- Kingdom: Animalia
- Phylum: Mollusca
- Class: Gastropoda
- Subclass: Caenogastropoda
- Order: Neogastropoda
- Family: Turbinellidae
- Genus: Turbinella
- Species: T. tuberculata

Binomial name
- Turbinella tuberculata Anton, 1838

Synonyms
- Fasciolaria tuberculata Anton, 1838

Species of gastropod

Turbinella tuberculata is a species of sea snail, a marine gastropod mollusc in the family Turbinellidae.

This is a species inquirenda.
