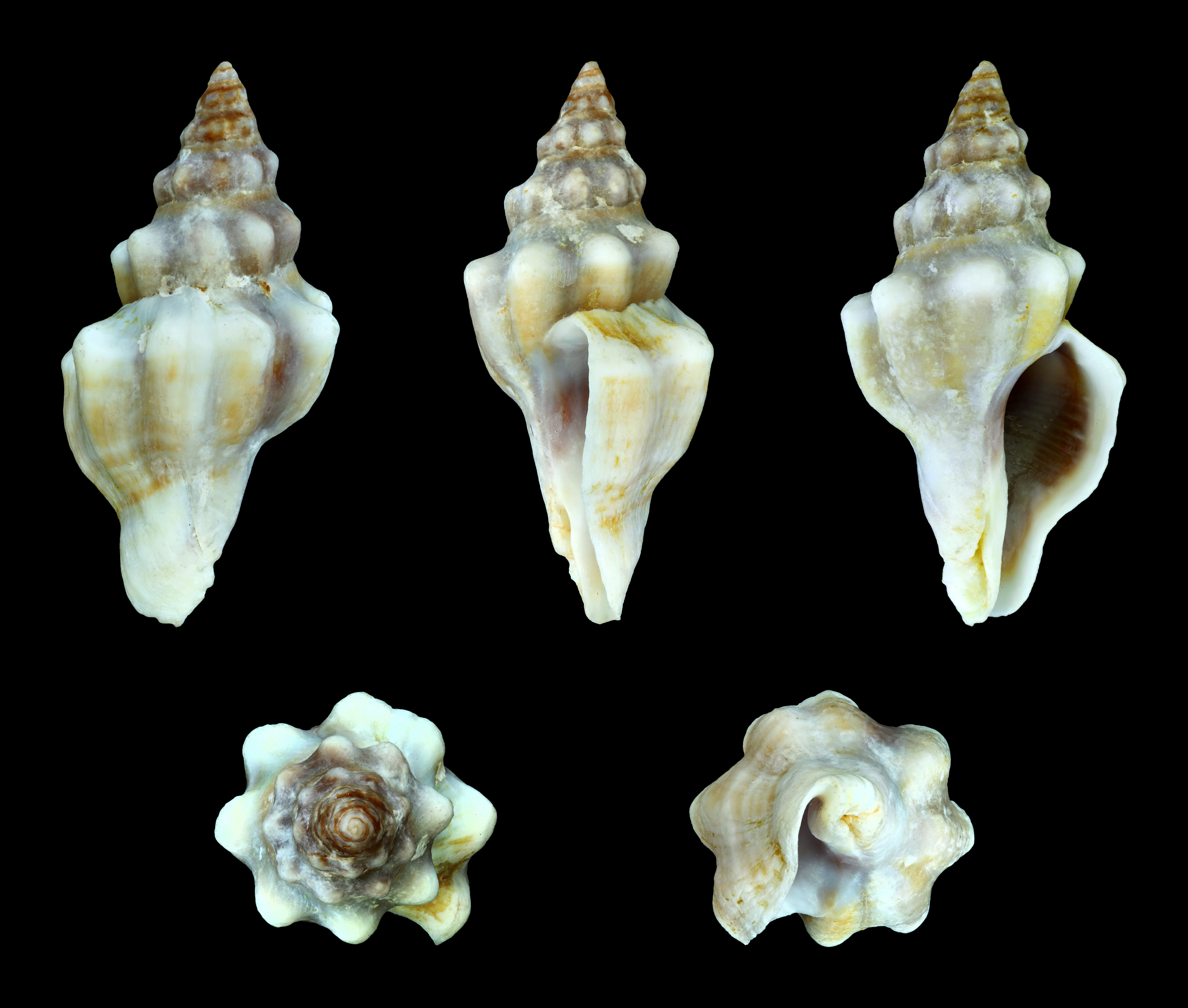
- Tarantinaea lignaria shell

Scientific classification
- Kingdom: Animalia
- Phylum: Mollusca
- Class: Gastropoda
- Subclass: Caenogastropoda
- Order: Neogastropoda
- Family: Fasciolariidae
- Genus: Tarantinaea
- Species: T. lignaria

Binomial name
- Tarantinaea lignaria (Linnaeus, 1758)

Synonyms
- Fasciolaria lignaria (Linnaeus, 1758); Fasciolaria savignyi Tapparone-Canefri, 1875; Fasciolaria tarentina Lamarck, 1822; Latirus unifasciatus (W. Wood, 1828); Murex lignarius Linnaeus, 1758; Murex unifasciatus W. Wood, 1828; Turbinella unifasciata (W. Wood, 1828)

= Tarantinaea lignaria =

Species of gastropod

Tarantinaea lignaria is a species of sea snail, a marine gastropod mollusk in the family Fasciolariidae, the spindle snails, the tulip snails and their allies.

== Distribution ==
This species occurs in European waters and in the Mediterranean Sea.

== Description ==
Tarantinaea lignaria has a shell that reaches a length of 30–60 mm. The surface of this shell may whitish or pale brown. The interior is brown.
