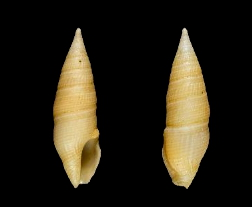
- Shells of Crassispira aurea (museum specimens at MNHN, Paris)

Scientific classification
- Kingdom: Animalia
- Phylum: Mollusca
- Class: Gastropoda
- Subclass: Caenogastropoda
- Order: Neogastropoda
- Superfamily: Conoidea
- Family: Pseudomelatomidae
- Genus: Crassispira
- Species: C. aurea

Binomial name
- Crassispira aurea Kantor, Stahlschmidt, Aznar-Cormano, Bouchet & Puillandre, 2017

= Crassispira aurea =

Species of gastropod

Crassispira aurea is a species of sea snail, a marine gastropod mollusk in the family Pseudomelatomidae.

== Description ==
The length of the shell attains 20 mm.

== Distribution ==
This marine species occurs off Tahiti and in the Society, Tuamotus and Gambier archipelagoes.
