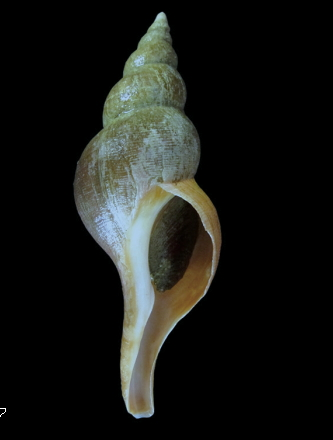
- Shell of Africolaria rutila

Scientific classification
- Kingdom: Animalia
- Phylum: Mollusca
- Class: Gastropoda
- Subclass: Caenogastropoda
- Order: Neogastropoda
- Family: Fasciolariidae
- Genus: Africolaria
- Species: A. rutila

Binomial name
- Africolaria rutila (Watson, 1882)

Synonyms
- Fasciolaria rutila Watson, 1882 (original combination)

= Africolaria rutila =

Species of gastropod

Africolaria rutila, common name the smooth horse conch, is a species of sea snail, a marine gastropod mollusk in the family Fasciolariidae, the spindle snails, the tulip snails and their allies.

== Description ==
The shell grows to a length up to 175 mm, perhaps more.

The shell is spindle-shaped, with the spire and aperture roughly equal in length. The whorls are evenly rounded, and the surface is sculpted with fine spiral threads. The siphonal canal is of moderate length. The inner lip features a single spiral columellar pleat at the base of the siphonal canal, occasionally accompanied by a second pleat nearby. The parietal region shows an indistinct, in-running spiral ridge just below the insertion of the outer lip. The interior of the outer lip is smooth, and the tip of the spire is slightly bulbous when intact, though it may appear worn or damaged.

The shell is whitish, covered by a thin, pale horn-colored or orange-brown periostracum, which is often eroded on the spire. The animal is yellowish-white to pale yellow in color.

== Distribution ==
This marine species is endemic top South Africa and occurs off the west coast to the Namibian border and the Agulhas Bank at depths between 65 m and 500 m.
