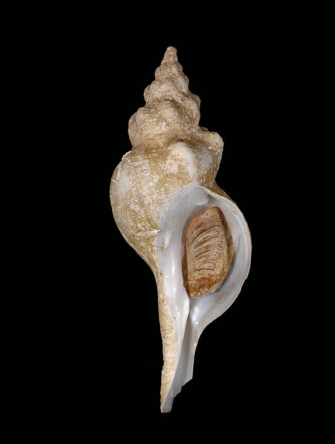
- Shell of Africolaria thersites

Scientific classification
- Kingdom: Animalia
- Phylum: Mollusca
- Class: Gastropoda
- Subclass: Caenogastropoda
- Order: Neogastropoda
- Family: Fasciolariidae
- Genus: Africolaria
- Species: A. thersites

Binomial name
- Africolaria thersites (Reeve, 1847)

Synonyms
- Fasciolaria thersites (Reeve, 1847) ·; Turbinella thersites Reeve, 1847 (original combination)

= Africolaria thersites =

Species of gastropod

Africolaria thersites, common name the varicose horse conch, is a species of sea snail, a marine gastropod mollusk in the family Fasciolariidae, the spindle snails, the tulip snails and their allies.

== Description ==
The length of the shell is up to 100 mm. The shell is spindle-shaped, with the spire accounting for half to two-thirds of the total aperture length. The whorls typically have strong, widely spaced axial ribs, most pronounced at the shoulder, though the sculpture can vary, with some specimens having few or no ribs on the later whorls. The spiral sculpture consists of very fine threads. The siphonal canal is of moderate length. The inner lip features a strong spiral columellar pleat at the start of the siphonal canal, with a second, weaker pleat just above it. A third, narrow, in-running spiral ridge is present in the parietal region, just below the insertion of the outer lip. The interior of the outer lip is smooth, and the tip of the spire is slightly bulbous when intact, though it may appear damaged or worn.

The shell is white, covered by a thin, pale horn-brown periostracum, which is often worn away on the spire.

== Distribution ==
This marine species is endemic to South Africa and occurs off the Agulhas Bank (west of Cape Town to Tsitsikamma) at depths between 100 m and 200 m.

== Bibliography ==
- Kilburn, R.N. (1974) Taxonomic notes on South African marine Mollusca (3): Gastropoda: Prosobranchia, with descriptions of new taxa of Naticidae, Fasciolariidae, Magilidae, Volutomitridae and Turridae. Annals of the Natal Museum, 22, 187–220
- Marais J.P. & R.N. Kilburn (2010) Fasciolariidae. pp. 106–137, in: Marais A.P. & Seccombe A.D. (eds), Identification guide to the seashells of South Africa. Volume 1. Groenkloof: Centre for Molluscan Studies. 376 pp.
- Snyder M.A., Vermeij G.J. & Lyons W.G. (2012) The genera and biogeography of Fasciolariinae (Gastropoda, Neogastropoda, Fasciolariidae). Basteria 76(1–3): 31–70.
