= Triplofusus princeps =

Scientific classification
- Kingdom: Animalia
- Phylum: Mollusca
- Class: Gastropoda
- Subclass: Caenogastropoda
- Order: Neogastropoda
- Family: Fasciolariidae
- Genus: Triplofusus
- Species: T. princeps

Binomial name
- Triplofusus princeps (G.B. Sowerby I, 1825)

Synonyms
- Fasciolaria acutispsira Strebel, 1911; Fasciolaria princeps G.B. Sowerby I, 1825 (original combination); Pleuroploca acutispira (Strebel, 1911); Pleuroploca princeps (G.B. Sowerby I, 1825)

Species of gastropod

Triplofusus princeps is a species of sea snail, a marine gastropod mollusk in the family Fasciolariidae, the spindle snails, the tulip snails and their allies.

== Description ==
Shell size 350 mm.

== Distribution ==
West Panama.
