= Abacetus afer =

Scientific classification
- Kingdom: Animalia
- Phylum: Arthropoda
- Class: Insecta
- Order: Coleoptera
- Suborder: Adephaga
- Family: Carabidae
- Genus: Abacetus
- Species: A. afer

Binomial name
- Abacetus afer Tschitscherine, 1899

Species of beetle

Abacetus afer is a species of ground beetle in the subfamily Pterostichinae. It was described by Tschitscherine in 1899 and is found in Burkina Faso and Democratic Republic of the Congo, Africa.
