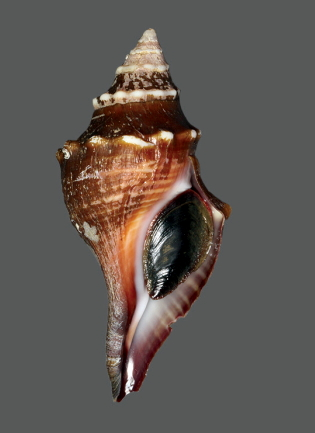
- Shell of Kilburnia heynemanni

Scientific classification
- Kingdom: Animalia
- Phylum: Mollusca
- Class: Gastropoda
- Subclass: Caenogastropoda
- Order: Neogastropoda
- Family: Fasciolariidae
- Genus: Kilburnia
- Species: K. heynemanni

Binomial name
- Kilburnia heynemanni (Dunker, 1876)

Synonyms
- Fasciolaria (Pleuroploca) heynemanni Dunker, 1876; Fasciolaria dunkeri Strebel, 1912 (junior synonym); Fasciolaria heynemanni Dunker, 1876 (original combination); Fasciolaria lugubris heynemanni Dunker, 1876; Fasciolaria strebeli Fulton, 1930 (junior synonym); Kilburnia dunkeri (Strebel, 1911); Kilburnia strebeli (Fulton, 1930); Pleuroploca heynemanni (Dunker, 1876); Pleuroploca lugubris heynemanni (Dunker, 1876)

= Kilburnia heynemanni =

Species of gastropod

Kilburnia heynemanni is a species of sea snail, a marine gastropod mollusk in the family Fasciolariidae, the spindle snails, the tulip (snails and their allies.

== Description ==
The length of the shell attains 135 mm.

The large shell is broadly spindle-shaped. The spire is about half the total length of aperture. The whorls show a distinct shoulder bearing strong, widely spaced nodules. The body whorl is smooth or spirally ridged. The inner lip is expanded at the base of the siphonal canal to form a strong fold, with one to two weaker pleats above this. The parietal region has a crisp in-running ridge just below insertion of outer lip. The outer lip is not sharply drawn in at its base. The interior of outer lip is smooth. Specimens from shallow water are smaller and have a crenulate outer lip.

The colour of the shell is cream to pale orange-brown, with a darker yellowish-brown to dark brown periostracum.

== Distribution ==
This marine species is endemic to South Africa and occurs off the Agulhas Bank (west to False Bay) and Transkei shelf, at depths between 25 m and 100 m.
