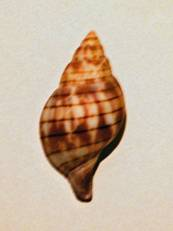
- Abapertural view of a shell of Cinctura lilium

Conservation status
- Secure (NatureServe)

Scientific classification
- Kingdom: Animalia
- Phylum: Mollusca
- Class: Gastropoda
- Subclass: Caenogastropoda
- Order: Neogastropoda
- Family: Fasciolariidae
- Genus: Cinctura
- Species: C. lilium

Binomial name
- Cinctura lilium (Fischer von Waldheim, 1807)

Synonyms
- Fasciolaria lilium Fischer von Waldheim, 1807; Fasciolaria lilium lilium Fischer von Waldheim, 1807; Fasciolaria (Cinctura) lilium Fischer von Waldheim, 1807; Fasciolaria distans Lamarck, 1822; Cinctura lilium lilium (Fischer von Waldheim, 1807)

= Cinctura lilium =

Cinctura lilium Temporal range: Pliocene-Recent

Species of gastropod

Cinctura lilium, common name the banded tulip, is a species of sea snail, a marine gastropod mollusk in the family Fasciolariidae, the spindle snails, the tulip snails and their allies.

== Description ==
The banded tulip shell does not grow as large as that of the true tulip, Fasciolaria tulipa. The color pattern is also different: the color splotches appear as a redder color (blue in rare areas) and the stripes that give the banded tulip its name are much further apart.

The shell grows to be 2 ¼ - 4 1/8 inches (5.7-10.5 cm) in length.

== Distribution ==
This species occurs off the coast of North and South Carolina and in the Gulf of Mexico from the Florida coast to the Gulf coast of Texas, and south into Mexico; in the Caribbean Sea.

== Habitat ==
C. lilium is found on sand or muddy sand from 2 to 150 feet depth.

== Feeding habits ==
Little is known about the banded tulip’s diet, but it is assumed that it is similar to the true tulip: small gastropods and bivalves.
