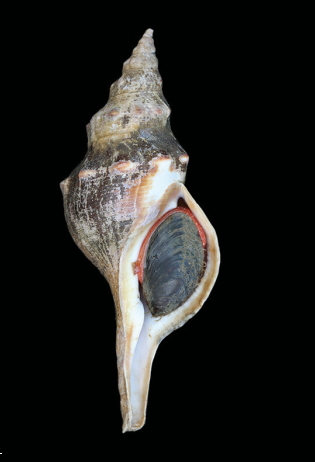
- Shell of Kilburnia scholvieni

Scientific classification
- Kingdom: Animalia
- Phylum: Mollusca
- Class: Gastropoda
- Subclass: Caenogastropoda
- Order: Neogastropoda
- Family: Fasciolariidae
- Genus: Kilburnia
- Species: K. scholvieni

Binomial name
- Kilburnia scholvieni (Strebel, 1912)

Synonyms
- Fasciolaria (Pleuroploca) scholvieni Strebel, 1912 (basionym); Fasciolaria agulhasensis Tomlin, 1932 (junior synonym); Fasciolaria alfredensis Bartsch, 1915 (junior synonym); Fasciolaria scholvieni Strebel, 1911; Kilburnia agulhasensis (Tomlin, 1932); Kilburnia alfredensis (Bartsch, 1915); Pleuroploca scholvieni (Strebel, 1912)

= Kilburnia scholvieni =

Species of gastropod

Kilburnia scholvieni, common name the Cape horse conch, is a species of sea snail, a marine gastropod mollusk in the family Fasciolariidae, the spindle snails, the tulip (snails and their allies.

== Description ==
The length of the shell attains 220 mm and perhaps more.

The shell is large and spindle-shaped, with a high spire comprising approximately three-quarters of the total aperture length. The whorls are rounded but may feature a subtle shoulder adorned with low nodules. Its surface displays fine spiral threads, with some specimens exhibiting occasional stronger cords. The outer lip tapers sharply at the base, forming a relatively slender siphonal canal. The inner lip has a strong fold at the base of the siphonal canal, with one or two faint columellar pleats above. The parietal region is marked by a rounded, in-running ridge just below the outer lip's insertion. The interior of the outer lip is mostly smooth, though mature specimens often have a subterminal row of denticles behind a slightly flaring outer lip.

The shell ranges in color from whitish to pale buff or orange-brown, with darker brown nodules. The periostracum varies from olive-brown to dark brown. The animal itself is orange-red.

== Distribution ==
This marine species is endemic to South Africa and occurs off the Agulhas Bank (Cape Agulhas to Port Grosvenor) at depths between 30 m and 250 m.
