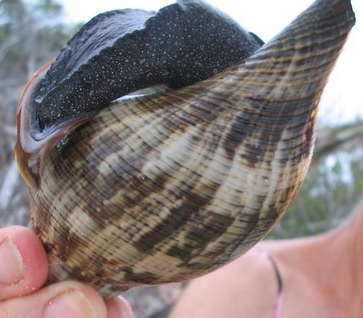
- A live Fasciolaria tulipa out of water

Scientific classification
- Kingdom: Animalia
- Phylum: Mollusca
- Class: Gastropoda
- Subclass: Caenogastropoda
- Order: Neogastropoda
- Family: Fasciolariidae
- Genus: Fasciolaria
- Species: F. tulipa

Binomial name
- Fasciolaria tulipa (Linnaeus, 1758)

Synonyms
- Colus achatinus Röding, 1798; Colus marmoratus Röding, 1798; Fasciolaria canaliculata Valenciennes, 1832; Fasciolaria concolor Kobelt, 1875; Fasciolaria rugosa Kobelt, 1875; Fasciolaria scheepmakeri Kobelt, 1875; Fasciolaria schepmackeri Sowerby II II, 1882; Fasciolaria obsoleta Dall, 1890; Murex tulipa Linnaeus, 1758; Neptunea laevigata Link, 1807; Fasciolaria riverai Petuch & Berschauer, 2026

= Fasciolaria tulipa =

Species of gastropod

Fasciolaria tulipa, common name the true tulip, is a species of large sea snail, a marine gastropod mollusk in the family Fasciolariidae. This fiercely predatory species occupies a wide geographic area within the Western Atlantic and is known, along with the other Fasciolariids, for the superficial resemblance their shells possess to a closed tulip flower.

== Habitat distribution ==
Fasciolaria tulipa has one of the largest geographic distributions of any western Atlantic Fasciolariid inhabiting the North Carolina coast and further south and west to the Gulf coast of Texas, the West Indies (where they have been identified universally regardless of water depth or island) and northern Brazil (35°N to 4°N; 97.22°W to 51°W). This species resides in the benthic zones of bodies of water with a maximum reported depth of 73 meters and are commonly found in seagrass beds and sand flats in marine environments. They also tend to inhabit shallow waters like estuaries and inlets. Some geographic locations they are commonly found are in the Gulf of Mexico along the gulf coast of Florida and near the Florida Keys.

== Shell description ==
The tulip shell has a fusiform outline, with an overall smooth surface, and presents fine growth lines, and small denticles on the inner edge of its delicate outer lip. It is whitish to tan in color, with rows of darker brownish blotches of various sizes. Over the blotches are symmetrical rows of thin lines which spiral along the whorls of the shell, which are normally about 9 in number.

The shell of an adult tulip snail can be from 2.5” to 9.5” inches (6.4 – 24.1 cm) in length.

== Gallery ==
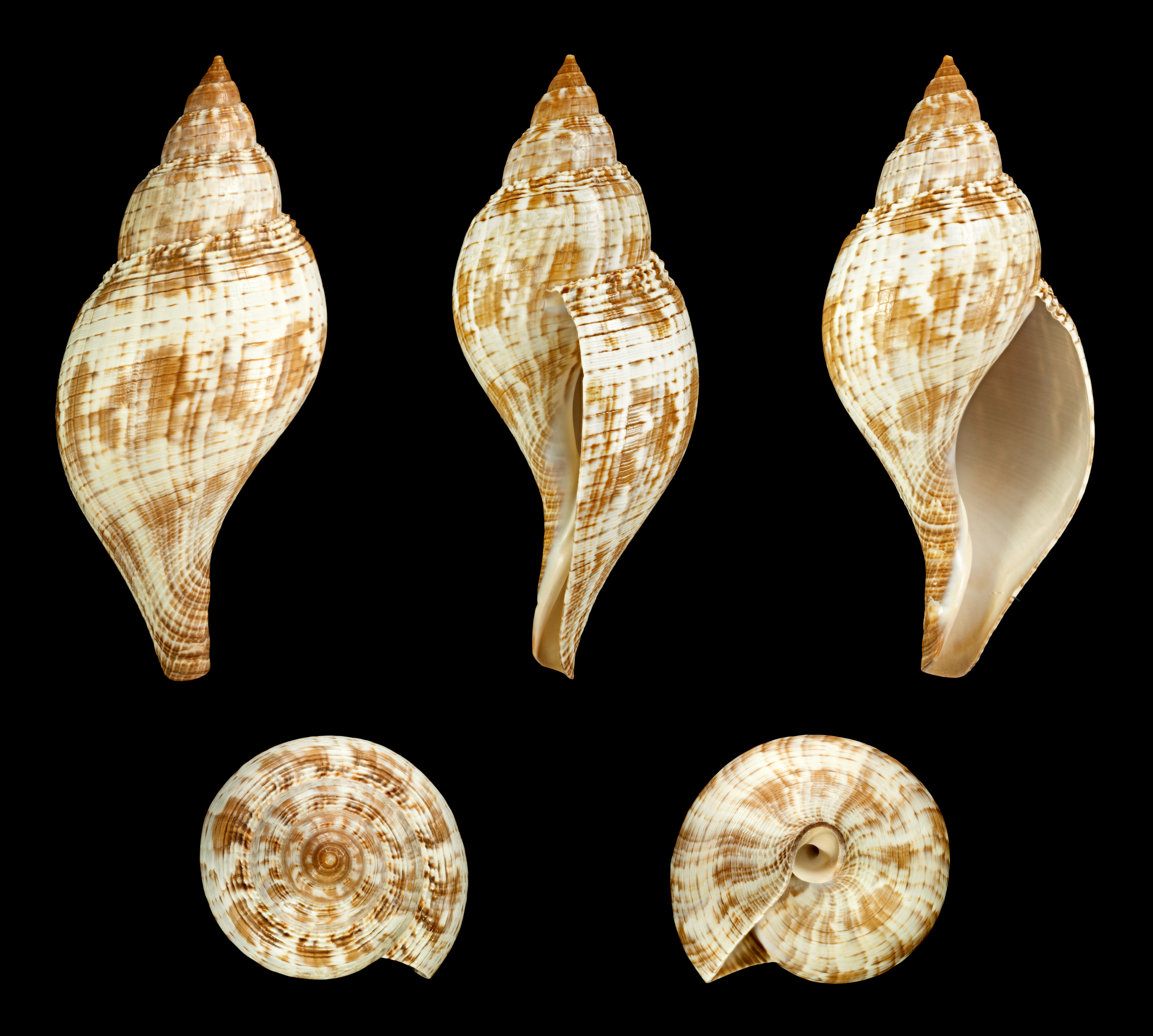

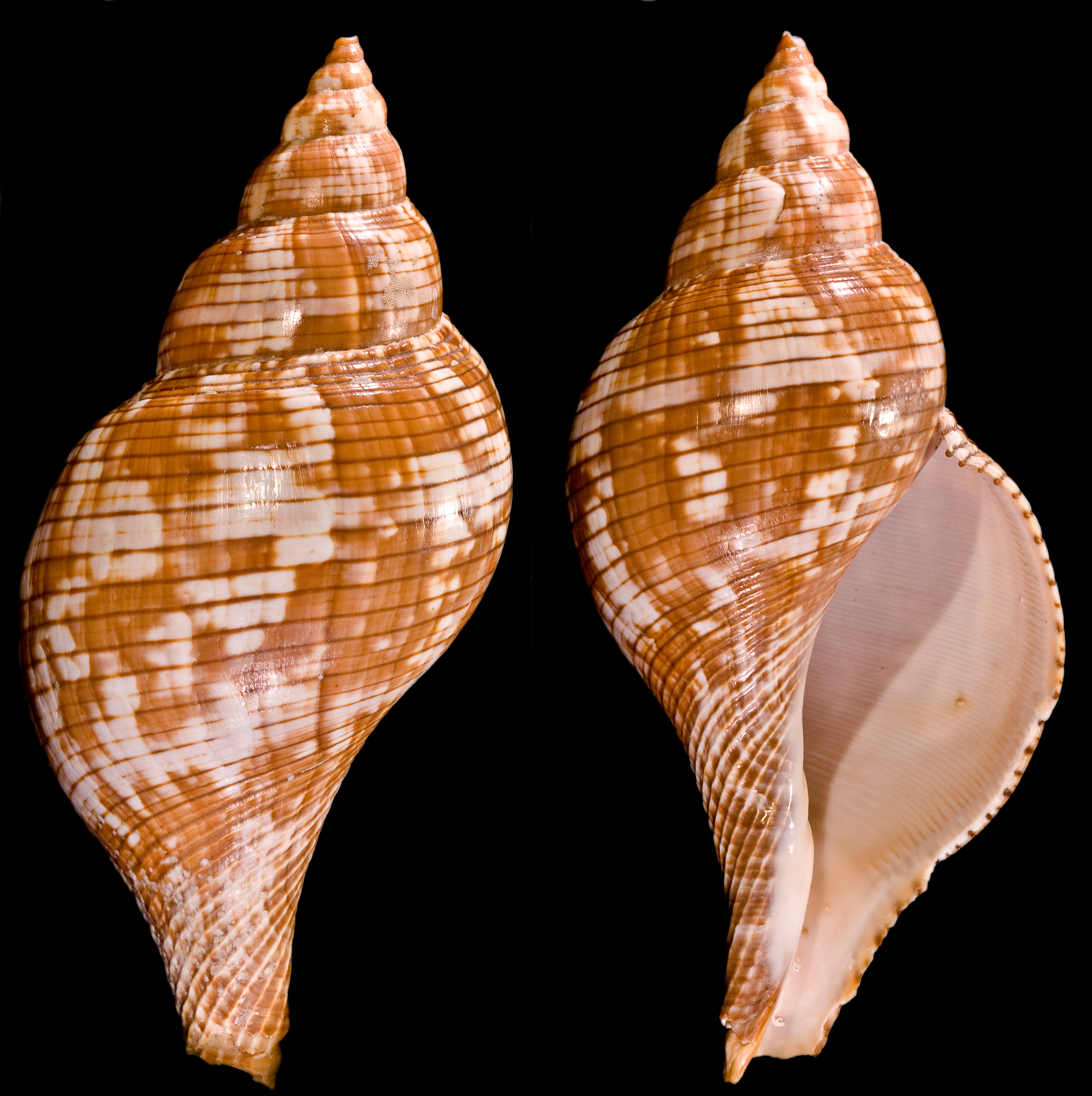
Abapertural (bottom) and apertural view of a shell.

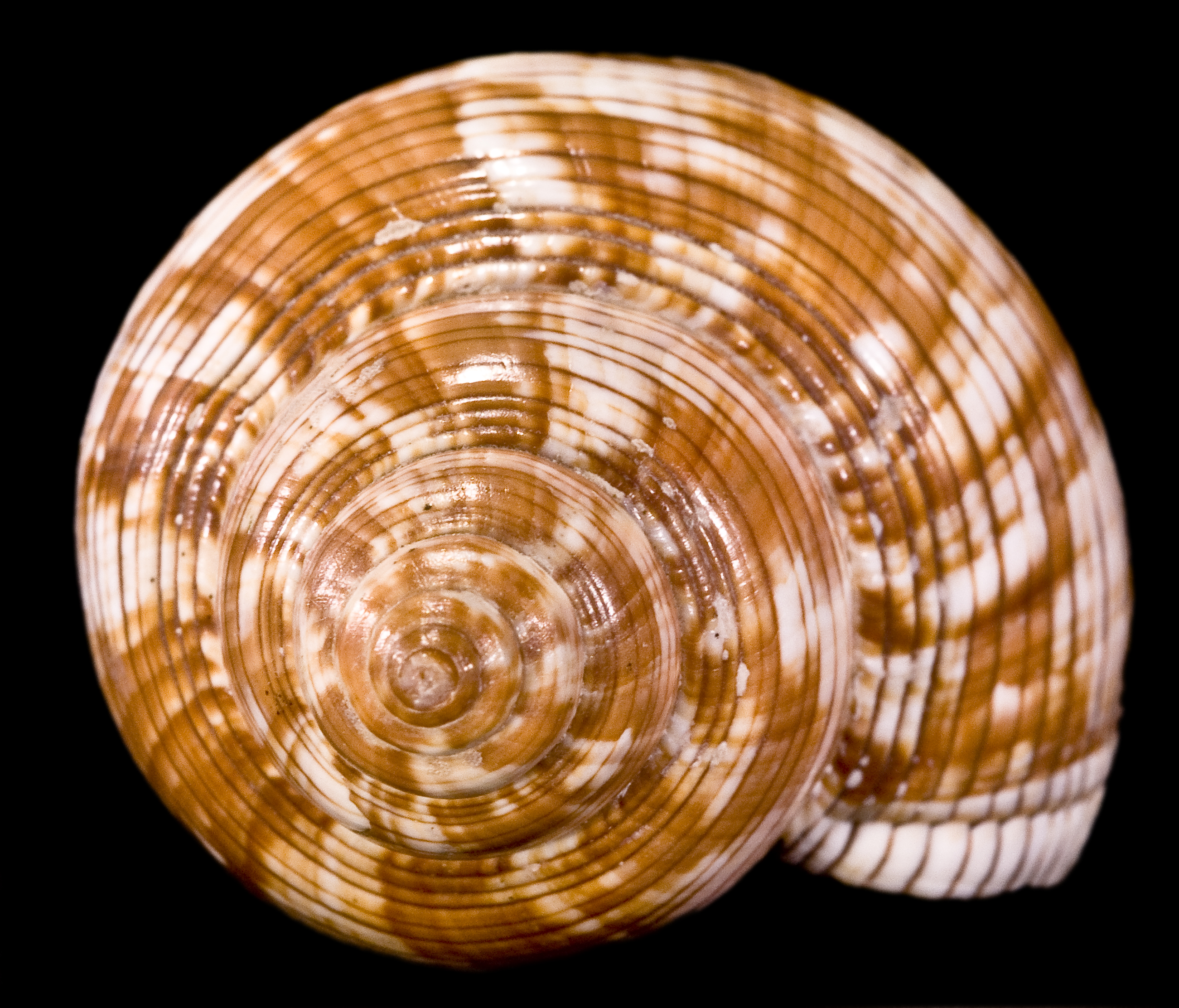
Apical view of a shell.

== Ecology ==
In 1969, Fasciolaria tulipa were seen in Alligator Harbor off the northwest coast of Florida found densities of one individual per 917 m-2 with little known about their behaviors and interactions. Today, it is known that Fasciolaria tulipa lives in the Benthic region of the ocean in a temperate habitat around seagrass beds and tidal flats and is larger than its relative: F. hunteria. Because of their habitat and size, tulip snails are cannibalized, which means they prey on others of the same species, and are preyed on as juveniles and adults by horse conchs, carnivorous crabs, snails, other crustaceans, sea stars, and bony fishes. In order to evade predation, the tulip snail uses its operculum to seal the aperture after it retracts into its shell when threatened or sense potential hazards. Another mode of protection is thrashing its muscular foot to escape a predators grasp.

== Feeding habits ==
This snail eats bivalves and various other gastropods including the banded tulip Fasciolaria lilium, and the queen conch Eustrombus gigas. It is a major predator of the thorny oyster Spondylus americanus.

== Reproduction ==
Fasciolaria tulipa reproduce internally via sexual reproduction. There are 5 observed reproductive cycles; rest, gametogenesis, mature, spawn, and post spawn. The rest stage is the period where little to no reproduction occurs. This stage allows for hatched larvae to begin growing and reach the mature stage. The next stage, gametogenesis, is the production and accumulation of mature gametes. This stage prepares for the mature and spawn stage. Both the mature and spawn stages are the time where reproduction is most active and eggs are being laid. The post spawn stage is a period where the eggs hatch and enter the larval stage. This process is repeated by returning to the rest stage after the larval stage has ended.

The spawning period was observed from January through October. Although spawning occurs for most of the year, October was the peak for this period. The post spawn stage followed soon after and was at its peak in November. The rest stage occurs in December, which is followed by the Gametogenesis stage in January. While these stages have peaks throughout the year, they are observed in individuals throughout the year. Some individuals will be at different stages than others.

Eggs are described as smooth, opaque, white capsules that hatch 14 embryos from each capsule. The egg capsules are laid in large groups attached to a hard surface near or on the seafloor. Larva develop directly from nutrients in the egg capsule, and are free swimming for up to six days after they hatch.

Males and females can be identified based on their reproductive organs. The female reproductive system consists of ovaries, cement glands located centrally on the foot, and the large pallial oviduct. The male reproductive system consists of testes, a narrow vas deferens, the prostate, and the penis.

== Economic importance ==
Fasciolaria tulipa hemocyanin can be dissociated and denatured by urea and Hofmeister salt series, potentially being used in drug development. Urea and Hofmeister salt series effectively dissociate Fasciolaria tulipa hemocyanin, suggesting hydrophobic stabilization of the subunit assembly.[1]
