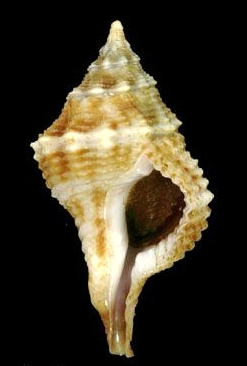
- Shell of Afer afer (specimen at the Natural History Museum Rotterdam)

Scientific classification
- Kingdom: Animalia
- Phylum: Mollusca
- Class: Gastropoda
- Subclass: Caenogastropoda
- Order: Neogastropoda
- Family: Tudiclidae
- Genus: Afer
- Species: A. afer

Binomial name
- Afer afer (Gmelin, 1791)
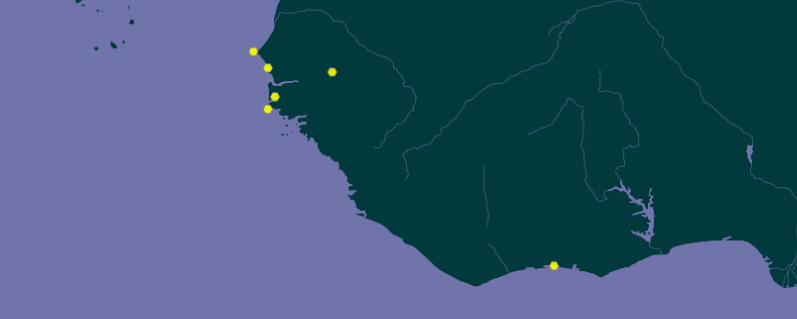

Synonyms
- Murex afer Gmelin, 1791 (original combination)

= Afer afer =

Species of gastropod

Afer afer is a species of large sea snail, marine gastropod mollusc in the family Tudiclidae.

== Description ==
(Original description in Latin) The shell is ovate and transversely striated, with a spire crowned by a series of flat whorls adorned with rounded tubercles.

== Distribution ==
This marine species occurs off Senegal and Ivory Coast.
