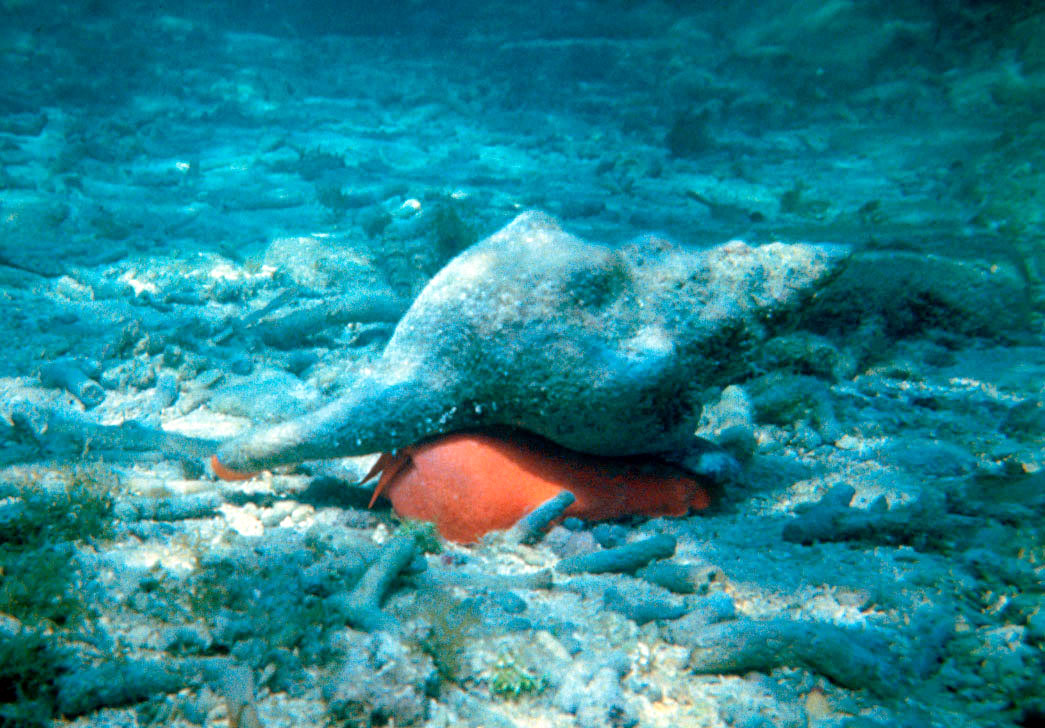
- In situ, note the orange soft parts

Scientific classification
- Kingdom: Animalia
- Phylum: Mollusca
- Class: Gastropoda
- Subclass: Caenogastropoda
- Order: Neogastropoda
- Family: Fasciolariidae
- Genus: Triplofusus
- Species: T. giganteus

Binomial name
- Triplofusus giganteus (Kiener, 1840)

Synonyms
- Fasciolaria gigantea Kiener, 1840; Fasciolaria papillosa f. elongata Strebel, 1911; Fasciolaria papillosa f. reevei Jonas, 1850; Fasciolaria papillosa juvenis Strebel, 1911; Fasciolaria reevei Jonas, 1850; Pleuroploca gigantea Kiener, 1840; Triplofusus papillosus auct.

= Triplofusus giganteus =

Species of tulip snail

Triplofusus giganteus, commonly known as the Florida horse conch or the giant horse conch, is a species of extremely large predatory subtropical and tropical sea snail, a marine gastropod mollusc in the family Fasciolariidae, the spindle snails, tulip snails and their allies. On average, it weighs over 11 pounds (5.0 kg).

Although known as a horse conch, this is not a true conch, as it is not in the family Strombidae.

With a shell length that can reach 60 centimetres (24 in), this species is the largest gastropod in United States waters, and one of the largest gastropods in the world.

== Taxonomy ==
Triplofusus giganteus was named by Louis Charles Kiener in 1840 as Fasciolaria gigantea, later placed in Pleuroploca, and finally assigned the genus Triplofusus in 1953. It has also been historically referred to as Fasciolaria papillosa, a name described by George Brettingham Sowerby I in 1825, though the original specimen is lost and species identity is uncertain.

== Distribution ==
This sea snail inhabits waters from North Carolina to the Yucatán Peninsula in the Gulf of Mexico.

Historical records suggest the range may have extended farther north along the Atlantic coast than currently observed. Factors such as ocean warming, coastal development, and overharvesting are believed to have contributed to a southern contraction in its distribution over the past century. Ongoing monitoring is required to determine whether such shifts are reversible through targeted conservation efforts.

== Anatomy ==
Triplofusus giganteus is the largest species of snail in North America. Female individuals are hypothesized to reach larger sizes than males. The soft parts are bright orange when extended; the snail can retract these into the shell and close off with its operculum.

=== Shell ===
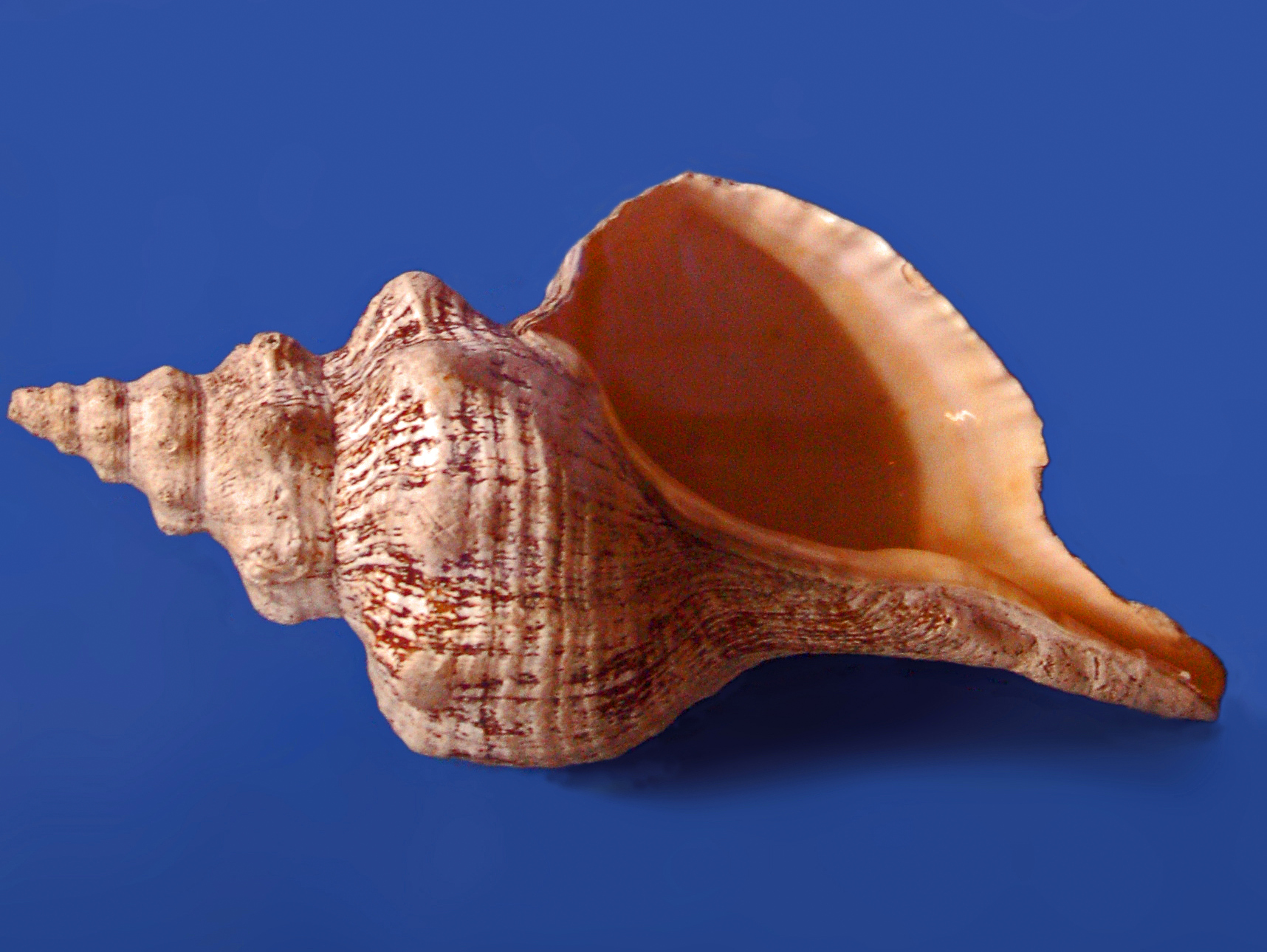
Triplofusus giganteus at the National Museum (Prague)

The largest known specimen measured 604.8 millimetres (23.81 in) in shell length. Recent surveys show maximum shell sizes have declined to 341–400 mm (13.4–15.7 in) due to overharvesting. The shell is sculpted with spiral cords and axial ribs forming knobs on some whorls. Juveniles exhibit bright orange shells, while adults often appear greyish white to salmon-orange as the periostracum darkens.

== Ecology ==
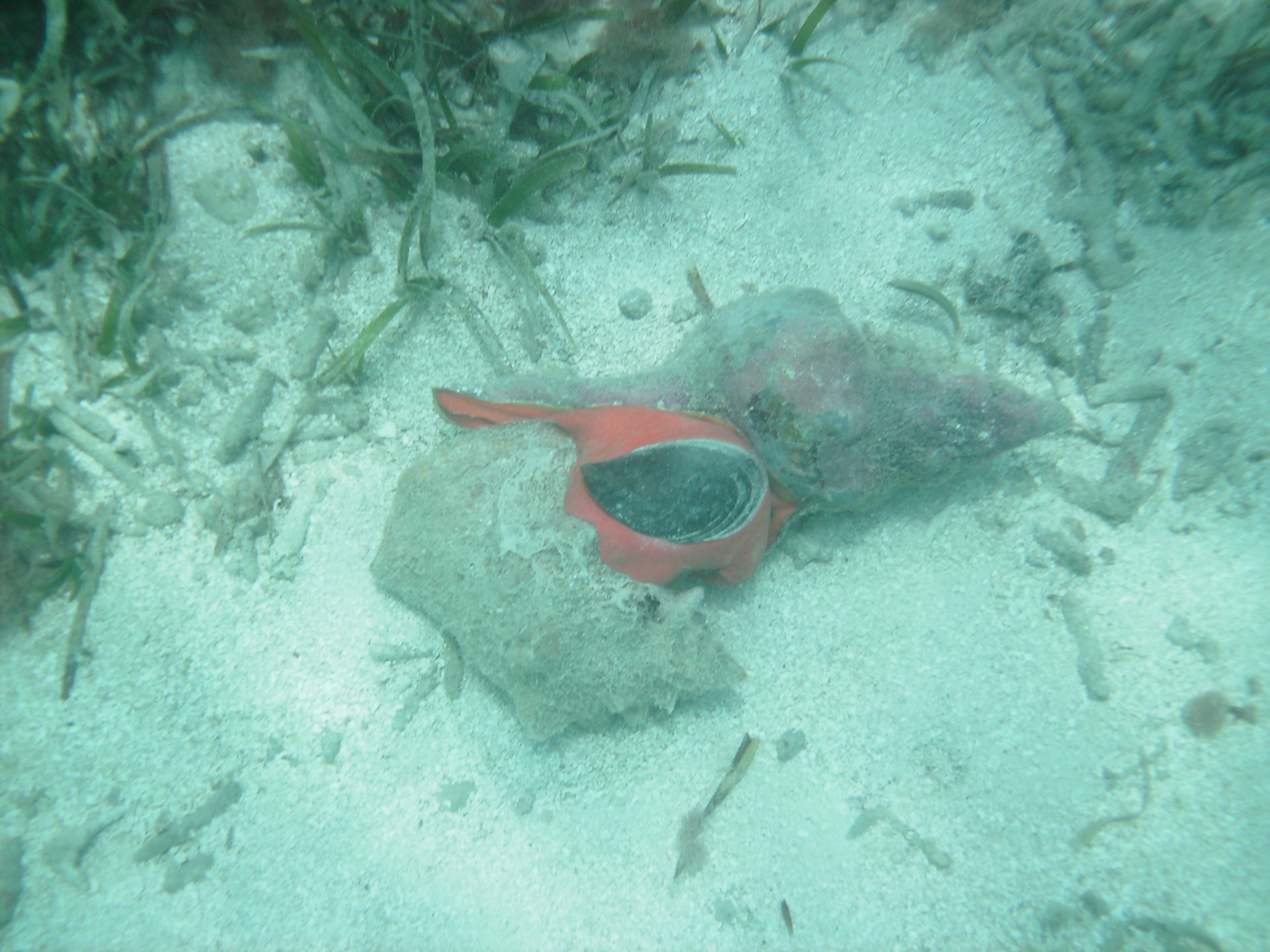
A horse conch feeding on the queen conch, Lobatus gigas, in Dry Tortugas National Park, Florida

=== Habitat ===
This species dwells on sand, weed, and mud flats from the low intertidal to shallow subtidal zones, commonly around 6 m (20 ft) depth, up to 100 m (330 ft).

=== Feeding habits ===
Triplofusus giganteus is a predator primarily of large gastropods such as tulip shell (Fasciolaria tulipa), lightning whelk (Sinistrofulgur perversum), and queen conch (Lobatus gigas), along with some species of Murex. Rarely consumed bivalves include pen shells (Atrina), which may comprise up to 20% of its diet. It has also been observed feeding on small hermit crabs (Clibanarius vittatus) in captivity. Cannibalism occurs rarely, typically only when food is scarce.

=== Ecological role and feeding interactions ===
As a top-level molluscan predator, T. giganteus plays a key role in structuring gastropod communities by preying on species like Fasciolaria tulipa and Sinistrofulgur perversum, thus helping maintain species balance and preventing dominance by a single group.

Summary of feeding relationships
Category	Species
Prey	Fasciolaria tulipa, Lobatus gigas, Sinistrofulgur perversum, Atrina spp.
Occasional Prey	Clibanarius vittatus (hermit crab)
Predator	Tiger shark (Galeocerdo cuvier)

These predator–prey relationships further underline the species' dual role within its ecosystem.

=== Reproduction ===
Female T. giganteus reach reproductive maturity at around six to seven years of age, when their shell length is about 200–250 mm (7.9–9.8 in). Each spawning event may produce up to 400 egg capsules, each containing approximately 70 embryos. Spawning events are infrequent, and females may live only a few years post-maturity.

=== Predators ===
Tiger sharks (Galeocerdo cuvier) and spotted eagle rays (Aetobatus narinari) are documented predators of adult horse conchs.

=== Parasites ===
Parasites include the trematode Lophotaspis vallei.

== Human use ==
=== Modern times ===
In 1969 the U.S. state of Florida declared it the state shell. The species is prized by collectors for its large size.

=== Archaeological and anthropological uses ===
In Classic Maya art, the horse conch was depicted as paint and ink containers for elite scribes and as musical instruments like trumpets. Native peoples in southern Florida (such as the Calusa and Tequesta) fashioned tools—including hammers and plummets—from the shell or its columella. Drinking cups were made from the body whorl. Archaeological finds in coastal Belize demonstrate its use in Mesoamerican exchange and ceremonial contexts by Classic Maya elites.

== Conservation ==
Populations are declining due to overharvesting and infrequent spawning events, putting the species at risk of collapse.

Beyond harvesting pressure, recent studies indicate that exposure to pollutants—particularly microplastics and heavy metals—may impair reproductive development and contribute to imposex, a condition where females develop male genitalia due to endocrine interference. Imposex has been documented along Florida's Gulf Coast and is a serious emerging threat to species recovery.
