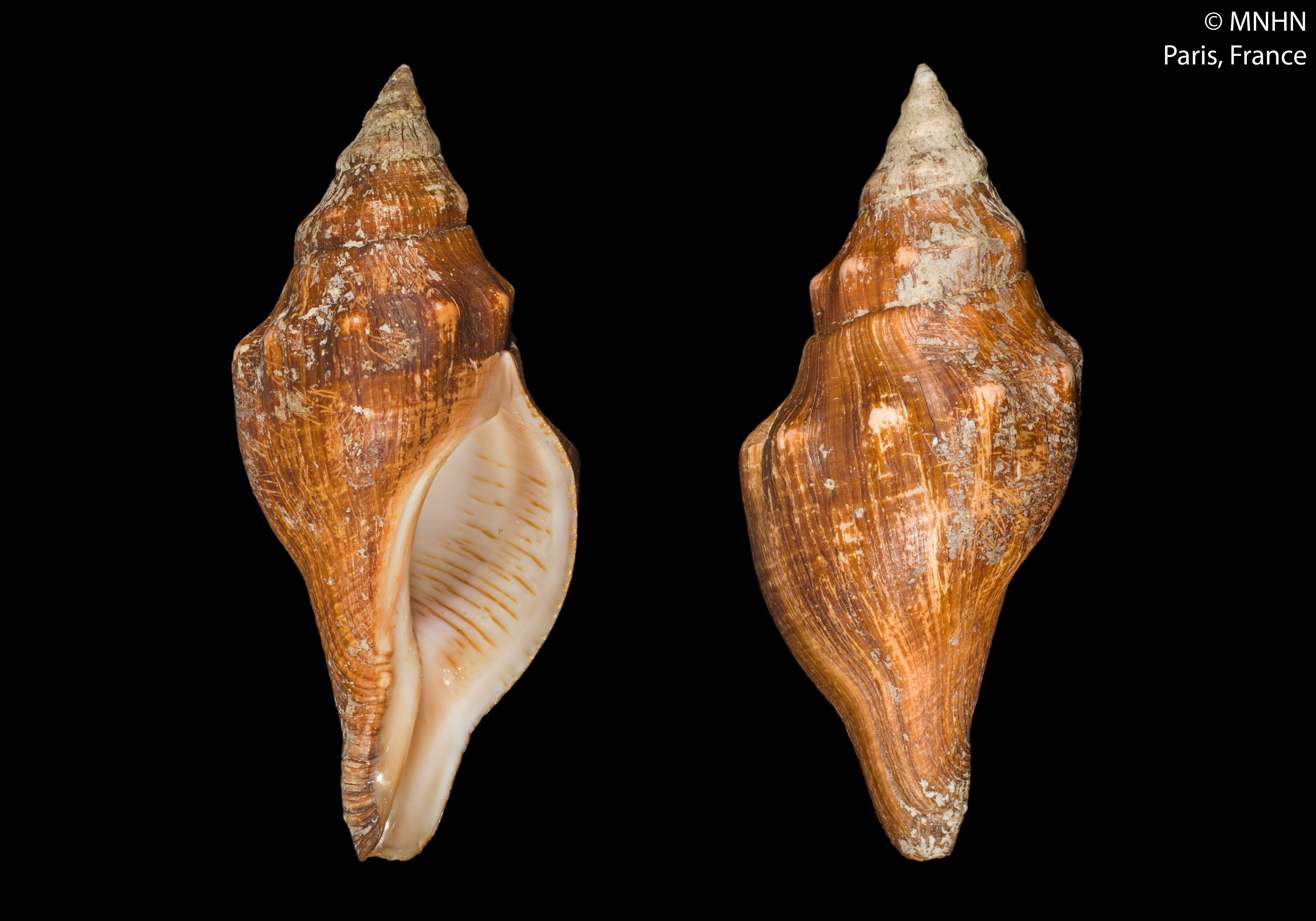
- Shell of Pleuroploca lyonsi

Scientific classification
- Kingdom: Animalia
- Phylum: Mollusca
- Class: Gastropoda
- Subclass: Caenogastropoda
- Order: Neogastropoda
- Superfamily: Buccinoidea
- Family: Fasciolariidae
- Genus: Pleuroploca; P. Fischer, 1884

Type species
- Murex trapezium Linnaeus, 1758

Synonyms
- Fasciolaria (Pleuroploca) P. Fischer, 1884

= Pleuroploca =

Genus of gastropods

Pleuroploca is a genus of very large predatory sea snails with an operculum, marine gastropod mollusks in the family Fasciolariidae, which includes the spindle shells, the tulip shells and other allied genera.

== Species ==
According to the World Register of Marine Species (WoRMS), the following species with valid names are included within the genus Pleuroplaca :

- Pleuroploca abbasi Thach, 2021
- Pleuroploca audouini (Jonas, 1846)
- Pleuroploca clava (Jonas, 1846)
- Pleuroploca effendyi Dharma, 2021
- Pleuroploca granosa (Broderip, 1832)
- Pleuroploca lischkeana (Dunker, 1863)
- Pleuroploca lyonsi Bozzetti, 2008
- Pleuroploca ponderosa (Jonas, 1850)
- Pleuroploca purpurea (Jonas, 1849)
- Pleuroploca trapezium (Linnaeus, 1758)

Species brought into synonymy

- Pleuroploca acutispsira (Strebel, 1911): synonym of Triplofusus princeps (G.B. Sowerby I, 1825)
- Pleuroploca altimasta Iredale, 1930: synonym of Filifusus altimasta (Iredale, 1930)
- Pleuroploca aurantiaca (Lamarck, 1816): synonym of Aurantilaria aurantiaca (Lamarck, 1816)
- Pleuroploca australasia (Perry, 1811): synonym of Australaria australasia (Perry, 1811)
- Pleuroploca buxeus (Reeve, 1847):: synonym of Viridifusus buxeus (Reeve, 1847)
- Pleuroploca eucla Cotton, 1953: synonym of Australaria eucla (Cotton, 1953)
- Pleuroploca filamentosa (Röding, 1798):: synonym of Filifusus filamentosus (Röding, 1798)
- Pleuroploca gigantea now recognized as Triplofusus papillosus (G. B. Sowerby I, 1825)
- Pleuroploca glabra (Dunker, 1882): synonym of Filifusus glaber (Dunker, 1882)
- Pleuroploca granulilabris Vermeij & Snyder, 2004:: synonym of Leucozonia granulilabris (Vermeij & Snyder, 2004)
- Pleuroploca heynemanni (Dunker, 1870): synonym of Kilburnia heynemanni (Dunker, 1870)
- Pleuroploca lugubris (A. Adams & Reeve in Reeve, 1847):: synonym of Lugubrilaria lugubris (A. Adams & Reeve, 1847)
- Pleuroploca manuelae Bozzetti, 2008: synonym of Filifusus manuelae (Bozzetti, 2008)
- Pleuroploca princeps (G.B. Sowerby I, 1825):: synonym of Triplofusus princeps (G.B. Sowerby I, 1825)
- Pleuroploca salmo (Wood, 1828):: synonym of Granolaria salmo (Wood, 1828)
- Pleuroploca scholvieni (Strebel, 1911):: synonym of Kilburnia scholvieni (Strebel, 1911)
- Pleuroploca wattersae (Kilburn, 1974):: synonym of Africolaria wattersae (Kilburn, 1974)
