= L. maximus =

L. maximus may refer to:

- Lagostomus maximus, the plains viscacha or plains vizcacha, a rodent species found in Argentina, Bolivia, and Paraguay
- Latirus maximus, a sea snail species
- Lethocerus maximus,A species of aquatic insect found in South America
- Limax maximus, the great grey slug or leopard slug, one of the largest kinds of keeled air-breathing land slug in the world native to Europe
- Longidorus maximus, a plant pathogenic nematode species

== See also ==
- Maximus (disambiguation)
