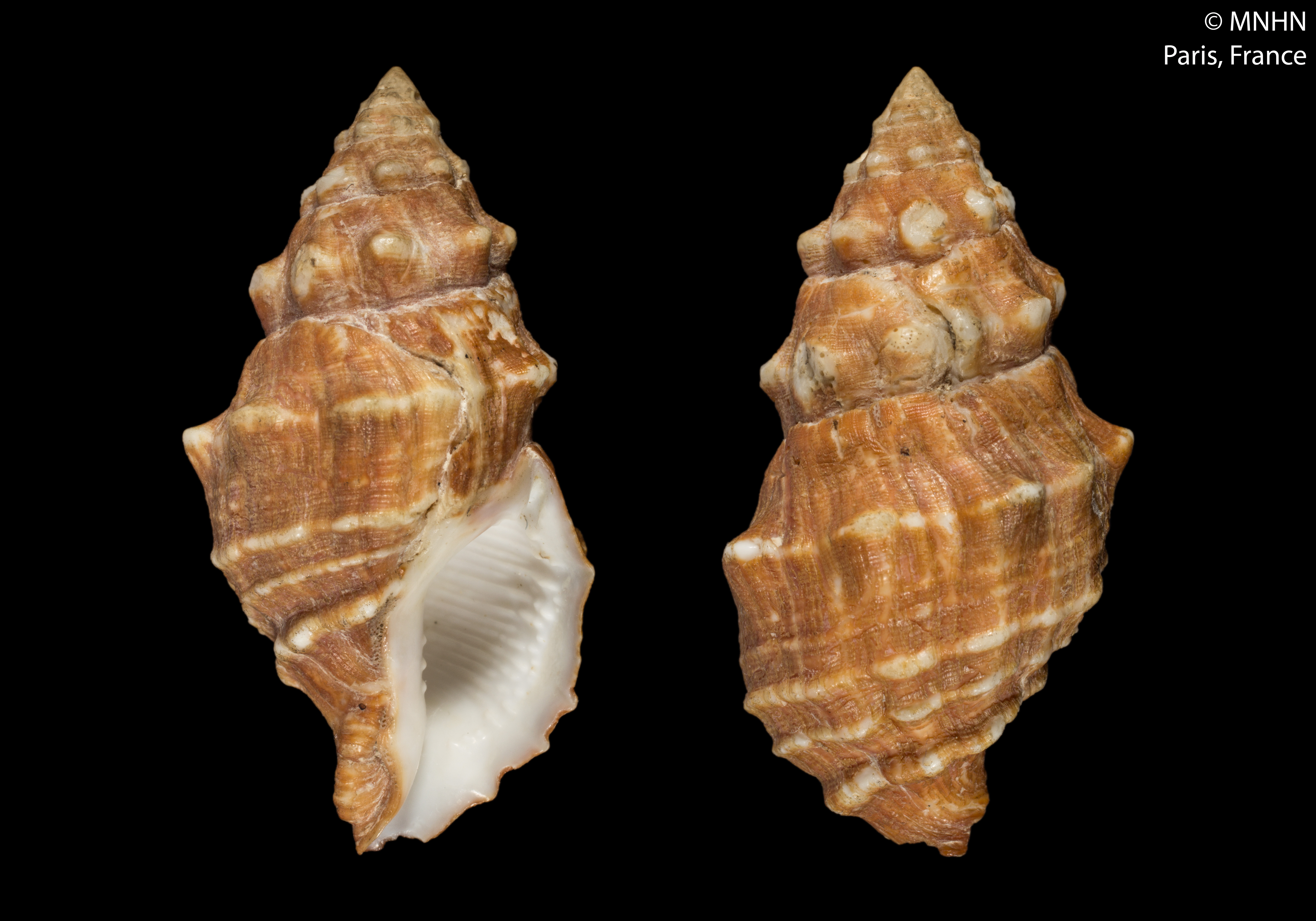
- Shell of Leucozonia triserialis (syntype at MNHN, Paris)

Scientific classification
- Kingdom: Animalia
- Phylum: Mollusca
- Class: Gastropoda
- Subclass: Caenogastropoda
- Order: Neogastropoda
- Superfamily: Buccinoidea
- Family: Fasciolariidae
- Genus: Leucozonia; Gray, 1847

Type species
- Murex nassa Gmelin, 1791

= Leucozonia =

Genus of gastropods

Leucozonia is a genus of sea snails, marine gastropod mollusks in the family Fasciolariidae, the spindle snails, the tulip snails and their allies.

== Description ==
The oval shell is subglobose. The spire is moderate. The aperture is oblong. The siphonal canal is short. The columella is subflexuous and shows small, oblique, unequal plaits. The outer lip is subacute, with a tooth or tubercle at the fore part.

== Species ==
Species within the genus Leucozonia include:

- Leucozonia cerata (Wood, 1828)
- Leucozonia granulilabris (Vermeij & Snyder, 2004)
- Leucozonia leucozonalis (Lamarck, 1822)
- Leucozonia nassa (Gmelin, 1791) - type species
- Leucozonia ocellata (Gmelin, 1791)
- Leucozonia ponderosa Vermeij & Snyder, 1998
- Leucozonia rudis (Reeve, 1847)
- Leucozonia triserialis (Lamarck, 1822)
- Leucozonia tuberculata (Broderip, 1833)

fossil species:

- Leucozonia rhomboidea (Gabb, 1873) from the Gurabo Formation (early Pliocene) of the Dominican Republic
- Leucozonia striatula Vermeij, 1997, from the Cercado (late Miocene) and basal Gurabo Formations of the Dominican Republic

synonyms

- Leucozonia caribbeana Weisbord, 1962: synonym of Leucozonia nassa (Gmelin, 1791)
- Leucozonia jacarusoi Petuch, 1987: synonym of Leucozonia nassa (Gmelin, 1791)
- Leucozonia knorrii (Deshayes, 1843): synonym of Leucozonia nassa (Gmelin, 1791)
- Leucozonia smaragdula (Linnaeus, 1758) is a synonym of Latirolagena smaragdula (Linnaeus, 1758)
- Leucozonia trinidadensis Mallard & Robin, 2005: synonym of Leucozonia nassa (Gmelin, 1791)
