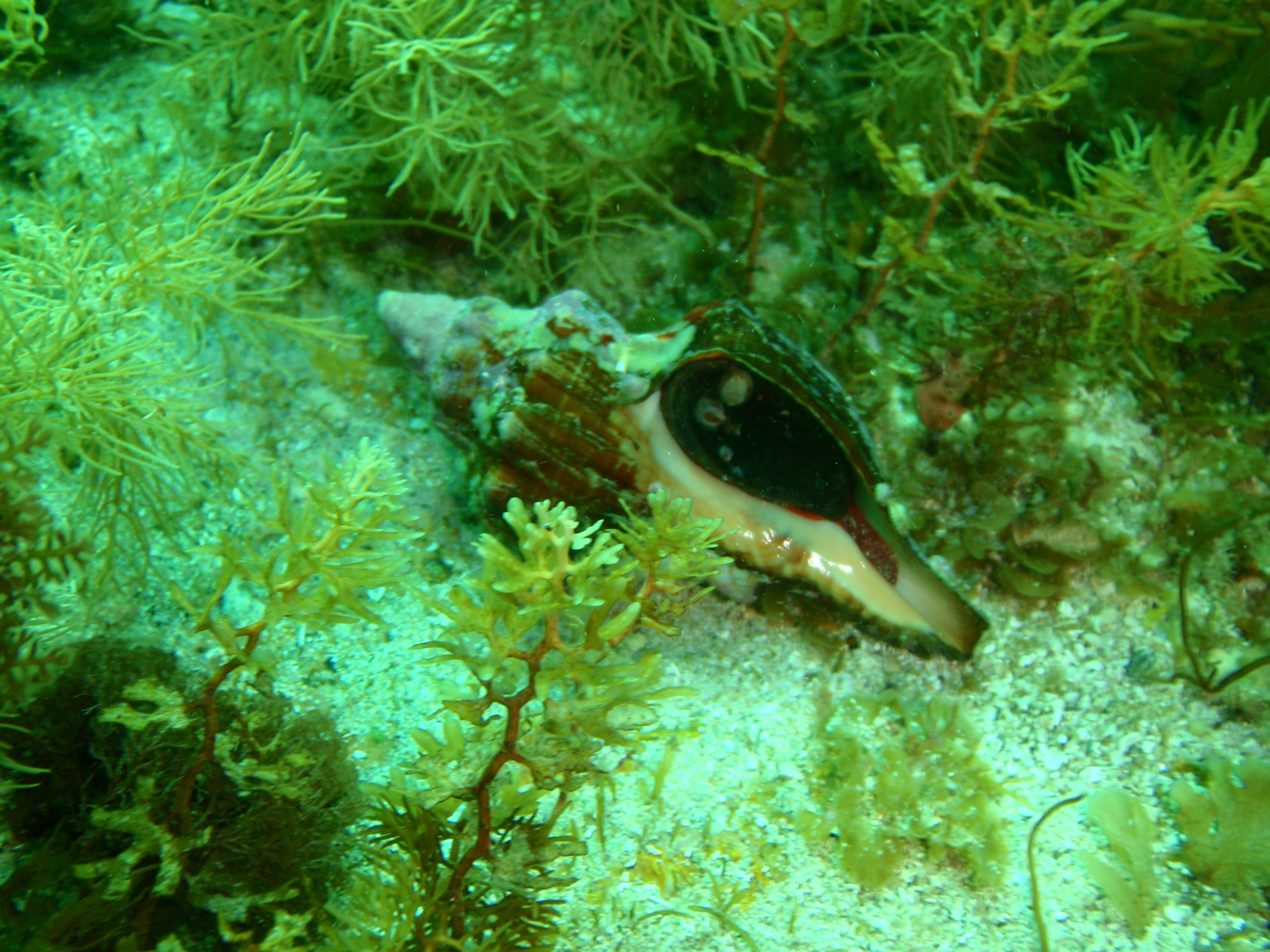

Scientific classification
- Kingdom: Animalia
- Phylum: Mollusca
- Class: Gastropoda
- Subclass: Caenogastropoda
- Order: Neogastropoda
- Family: Fasciolariidae
- Genus: Australaria; Snyder, Vermeij & Lyons, 2012

Type species
- Pyrula australasia Perry, 1811

= Australaria =

Genus of gastropods

Australaria is a genus of sea snails, marine gastropod mollusks in the family Fasciolariidae, the spindle snails, the tulip snails and their allies.

== Species ==
Species within the genus Australaria include:

- Australaria australasia (Perry, 1811)
- Australaria bakeri (Gatliff & Gabriel, 1912)
- Australaria coronata (Lamarck, 1822)
- † Australaria cristata (Tate, 1888)
- † Australaria cryptoploca (Tate, 1888)
- Australaria eucla (Cotton, 1953)
- Australaria fusiformis (Kiener, 1840)
- Australaria fusilla (Tate, 1889) †
- † Australaria lamellifera (Tate, 1888)
- † Australaria morundiana (Tate, 1888)
- † Australaria rugata (Tate, 1888)
- Australaria tenuitesta Snyder, Vermeij & Lyons, 2012
