= Lyonsifusus =

Lyonsifusus Temporal range: Cretaceous - Recent

Scientific classification
- Kingdom: Animalia
- Phylum: Mollusca
- Class: Gastropoda
- Subclass: Caenogastropoda
- Order: Neogastropoda
- Superfamily: Buccinoidea
- Family: Fasciolariidae
- Genus: Lyonsifusus; Vermeij & Snyder, 2018

Type species
- Murex ansatus Gmelin, 1791

Genus of gastropods

Lyonsifusus is a genus of sea snails, marine gastropod mollusks in the subfamily Fusininae of the family Fasciolariidae, the spindle snails and tulip snails.

== Species ==
- Lyonsifusus ansatus (Gmelin, 1791)
- Lyonsifusus carvalhoriosi (Macsotay & Campos, 2001)
