= Lugubrilaria =

Scientific classification
- Kingdom: Animalia
- Phylum: Mollusca
- Class: Gastropoda
- Subclass: Caenogastropoda
- Order: Neogastropoda
- Family: Fasciolariidae
- Genus: Lugubrilaria; Snyder, Vermeij & Lyons, 2012

Type species
- Fasciolaria lugubris A. Adams & Reeve, 1847

Genus of gastropods

Lugubrilaria is a genus of sea snails, marine gastropod mollusks in the family Fasciolariidae, the spindle snails, the tulip snails and their allies.

== Species ==
Species within the genus Lugubrilaria include:

- Lugubrilaria badia (Krauss, 1848)
- Lugubrilaria lugubris (A. Adams & Reeve, 1847)
- Lugubrilaria seccombei Lyons, 2012
