= Enigmofusus =

Scientific classification
- Kingdom: Animalia
- Phylum: Mollusca
- Class: Gastropoda
- Subclass: Caenogastropoda
- Order: Neogastropoda
- Superfamily: Buccinoidea
- Family: Fasciolariidae
- Genus: Enigmofusus; Vermeij & Snyder, 2018

Type species
- Fusus chrysodomoides Schepman, 1911

Synonyms
- Fusinus (Chryseofusus) Hadorn & Fraussen, 2003

Genus of gastropods

Enigmofusus is a genus of sea snails, marine gastropod mollusks in the subfamily Fusininae of the family Fasciolariidae, the spindle snails, the tulip snails and their allies.

== Species ==
Species within the genus Enigmofusus include:

- Enigmofusus beckii (Reeve, 1848)
- Enigmofusus nicki (Snyder, 2002)
