= Aurantilaria =

Scientific classification
- Kingdom: Animalia
- Phylum: Mollusca
- Class: Gastropoda
- Subclass: Caenogastropoda
- Order: Neogastropoda
- Family: Fasciolariidae
- Genus: Aurantilaria; Snyder, Vermeij & Lyons, 2012

Type species
- Fasciolaria aurantiaca Lamarck, 1816

Genus of gastropods

Aurantilaria is a monotypic genus of sea snails, marine gastropod mollusks in the family Fasciolariidae, the spindle snails, the tulip snails and their allies.

== Species ==
Species within the genus Aurantilaria include:

- † Aurantilaria angulata (Grateloup, 1845)
- Aurantilaria aurantiaca (Lamarck, 1816)
- † Aurantilaria cantaurana Landau & Vermeij, 2014
- † Aurantilaria carminamaris (Maury, 1917)
- † Aurantilaria kempi (Maury, 1910)
- † Aurantilaria macdonaldi (Olsson, 1922)
- † Aurantilaria magnospinata Landau & Vermeij, 2014
- † Aurantilaria michelotiana (Grateloup, 1845)
- † Aurantilaria pyrulaeformis (R. Hoernes & Auinger, 1890)
- † Aurantilaria rudis (Schaffer, 1912)
- † Aurantilaria tarbelliana (Grateloup, 1845)
