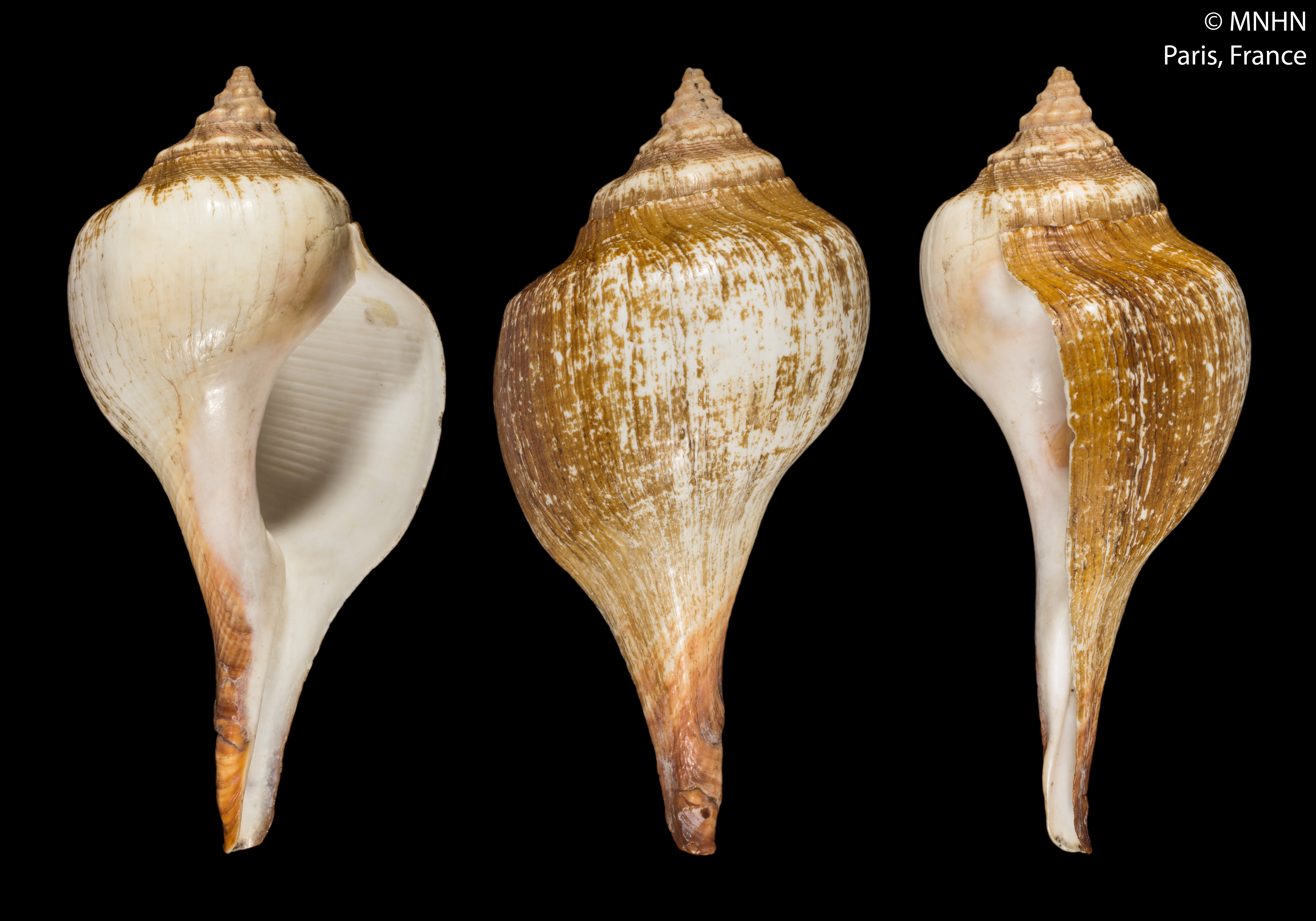
- Shell of Granolaria valenciennesii (holotype at MNHN, Paris)

Scientific classification
- Kingdom: Animalia
- Phylum: Mollusca
- Class: Gastropoda
- Subclass: Caenogastropoda
- Order: Neogastropoda
- Superfamily: Buccinoidea
- Family: Fasciolariidae
- Genus: Granolaria; Snyder, Vermeij & Lyons, 2012

Type species
- Murex salmo Wood, 1828

= Granolaria =

Genus of gastropods

Granolaria is a genus of sea snails, marine gastropod mollusks in the family Fasciolariidae, the spindle snails, the tulip snails and their allies.

== Species ==
Species within the genus Granolaria include:

- † Granolaria crassinoda (Weisbord, 1962)
- † Granolaria gorgasiana (A. P. Brown & Pilsbry, 1913)
- † Granolaria olssoni (F. M. Anderson, 1929)
- Granolaria salmo (Wood, 1828)
- † Granolaria turamensis (P. Jung, 1969)
- Granolaria valenciennesii (Kiener, 1840)

Species brought into synonymy

- Granolaria granosa (Broderip, 1832): synonym of Granolaria salmo (Wood, 1828)
