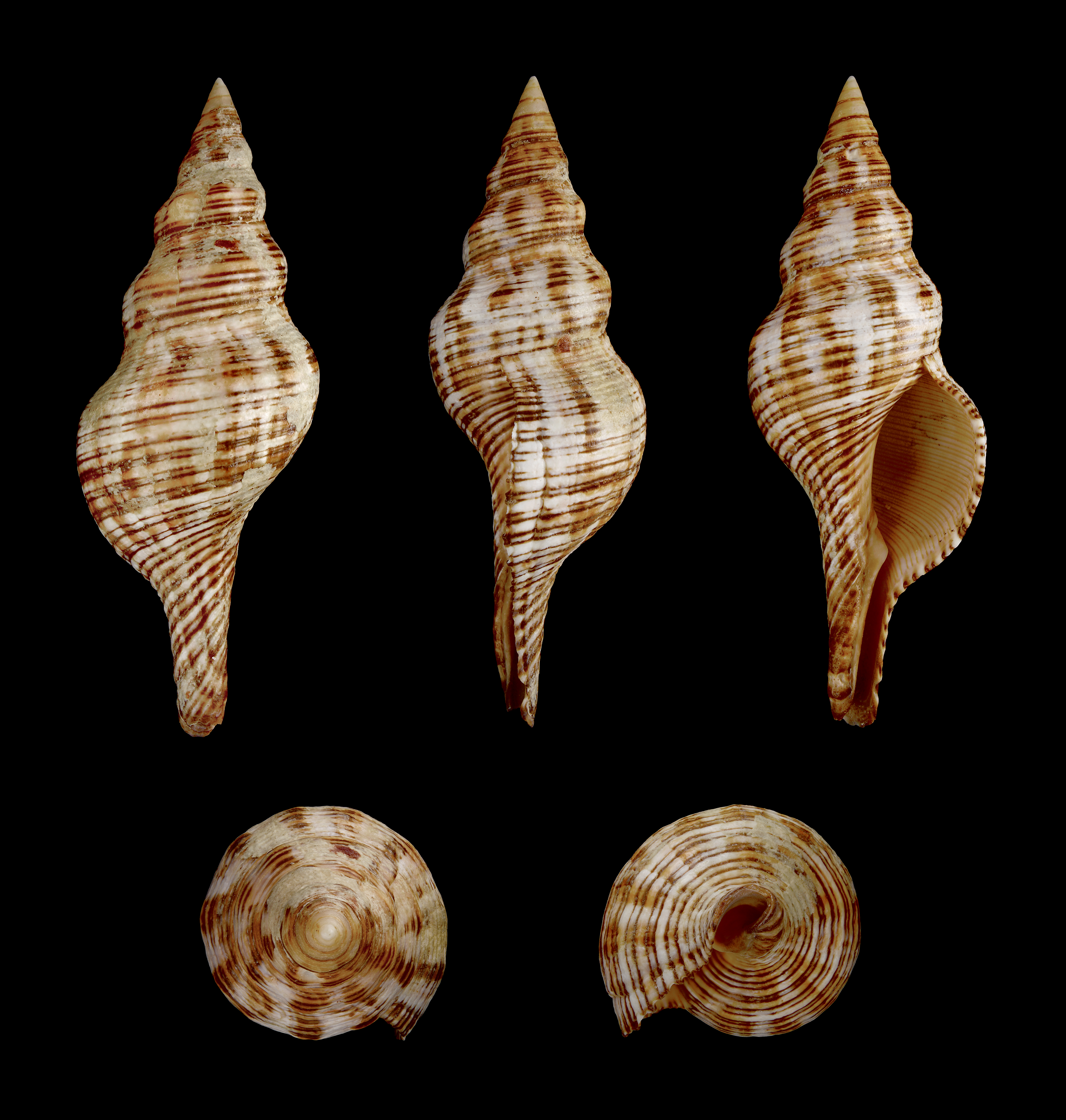
- Five views of a shell of Filifusus filamentosus

Scientific classification
- Kingdom: Animalia
- Phylum: Mollusca
- Class: Gastropoda
- Subclass: Caenogastropoda
- Order: Neogastropoda
- Superfamily: Buccinoidea
- Family: Fasciolariidae
- Genus: Filifusus; Snyder, Vermeij & Lyons, 2012

Type species
- Fusus filamentosus Röding, 1798

= Filifusus =

Genus of gastropods

Filifusus is a genus of sea snails, marine gastropod mollusks in the family Fasciolariidae, the spindle snails, the tulip snails and their allies.

== Species ==
Species within the genus Filifusus include:

- Filifusus altimasta (Iredale, 1930)
- Filifusus filamentosus (Röding, 1798)
- Filifusus glaber (Dunker, 1882)
- Filifusus inermis (Jonas, 1846)
- Filifusus manuelae (Bozzetti, 2008)
