= Leucozonia ponderosa =

Scientific classification
- Kingdom: Animalia
- Phylum: Mollusca
- Class: Gastropoda
- Subclass: Caenogastropoda
- Order: Neogastropoda
- Family: Fasciolariidae
- Genus: Leucozonia
- Species: L. ponderosa

Binomial name
- Leucozonia ponderosa Vermeij & Snyder, 1998

Species of gastropod

Leucozonia ponderosa is a species of sea snail, a marine gastropod mollusk in the family Fasciolariidae, the spindle snails, the tulip snails and their allies.
