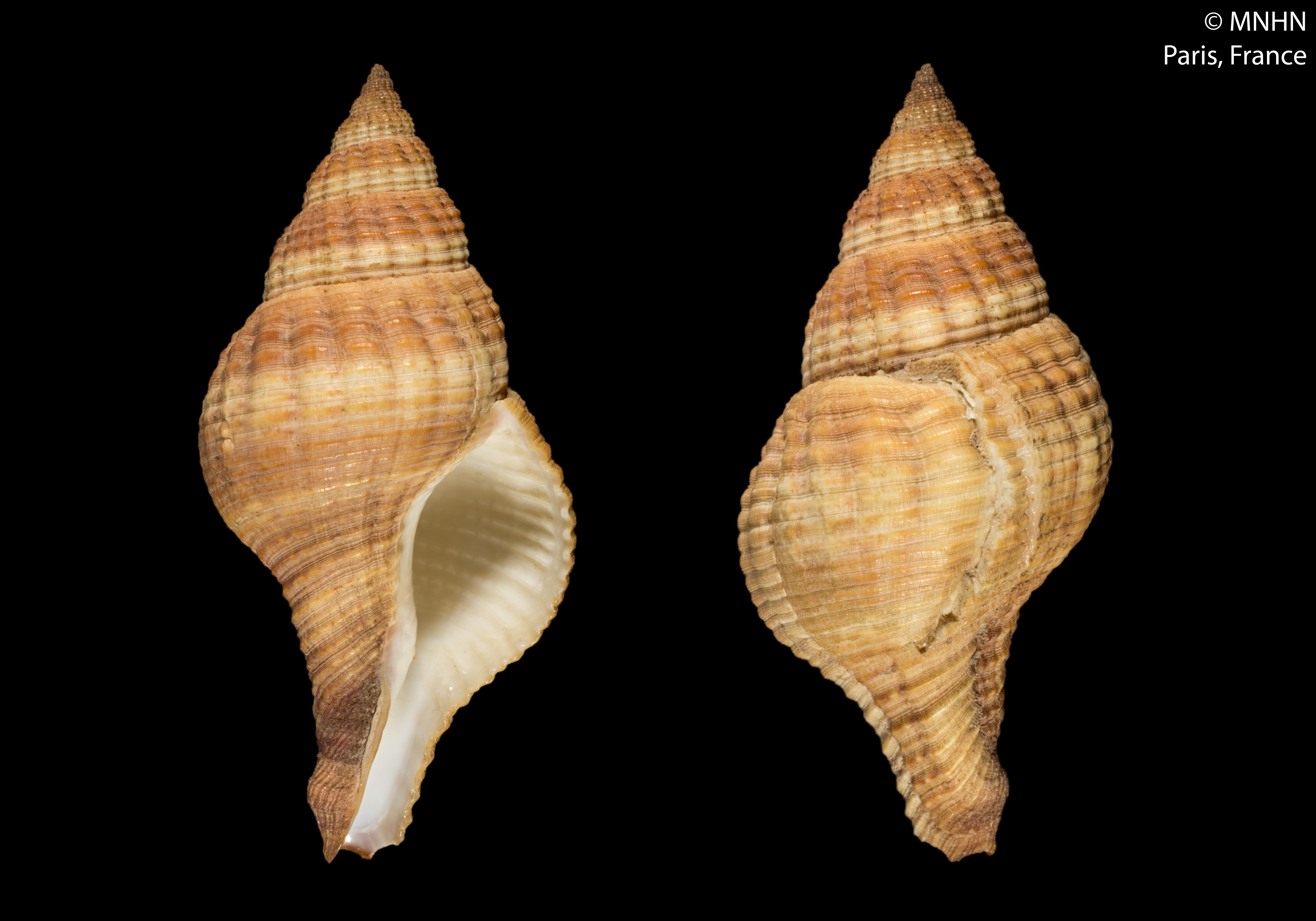
- Viridifusus buxeus

Scientific classification
- Kingdom: Animalia
- Phylum: Mollusca
- Class: Gastropoda
- Subclass: Caenogastropoda
- Order: Neogastropoda
- Family: Fasciolariidae
- Genus: Viridifusus; Snyder, Vermeij & Lyons, 2012

Type species
- Fusus buxeus Reeve, 1847

= Viridifusus =

Genus of gastropods

Viridifusus is a genus of sea snails, marine gastropod mollusks in the family Fasciolariidae, the spindle snails, the tulip snails and their allies.

They occur in the Atlantic Ocean off West Africa and the Cape Verdes.

== Species ==
Species within the genus Viridifusus include:

- Viridifusus albinus (A. Adams, 1856)
- Viridifusus buxeus (Reeve, 1847)
- Viridifusus maximus (G.B. Sowerby III, 1893)
- Viridifusus mollis (G. B. Sowerby III, 1913)
