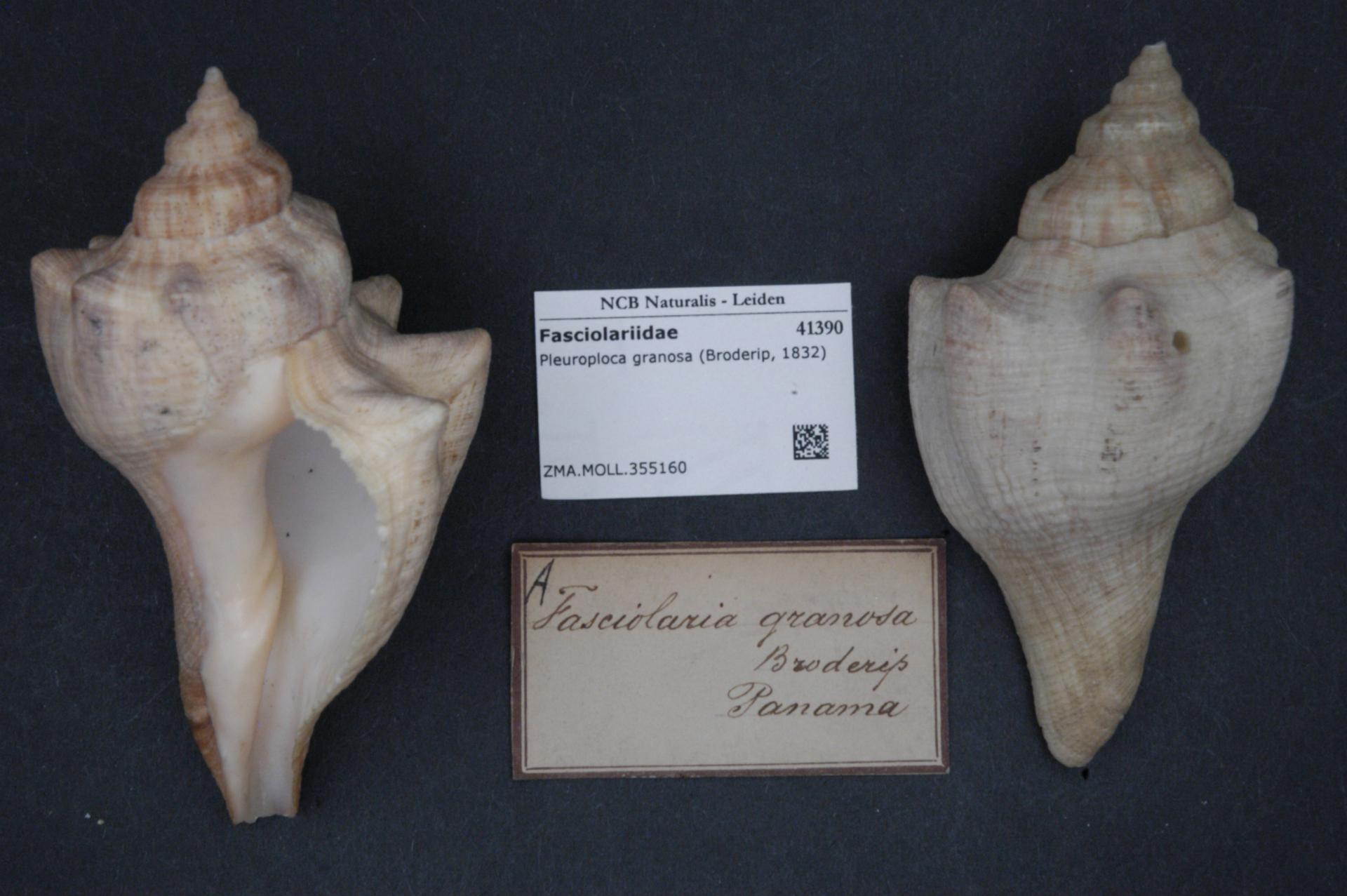
- Shells from the mollusc Pleuroploca granola.

Scientific classification
- Kingdom: Animalia
- Phylum: Mollusca
- Class: Gastropoda
- Subclass: Caenogastropoda
- Order: Neogastropoda
- Family: Fasciolariidae
- Genus: Pleuroploca
- Species: P. granosa

Binomial name
- Pleuroploca granosa (Broderip, 1832)

Synonyms
- Fasciolaria granosa Broderip, 1832

= Pleuroploca granosa =

Species of gastropod

Pleuroploca granosa is a species of sea snail, a marine gastropod mollusk in the family Fasciolariidae, the spindle snails, the tulip snails and their allies.
