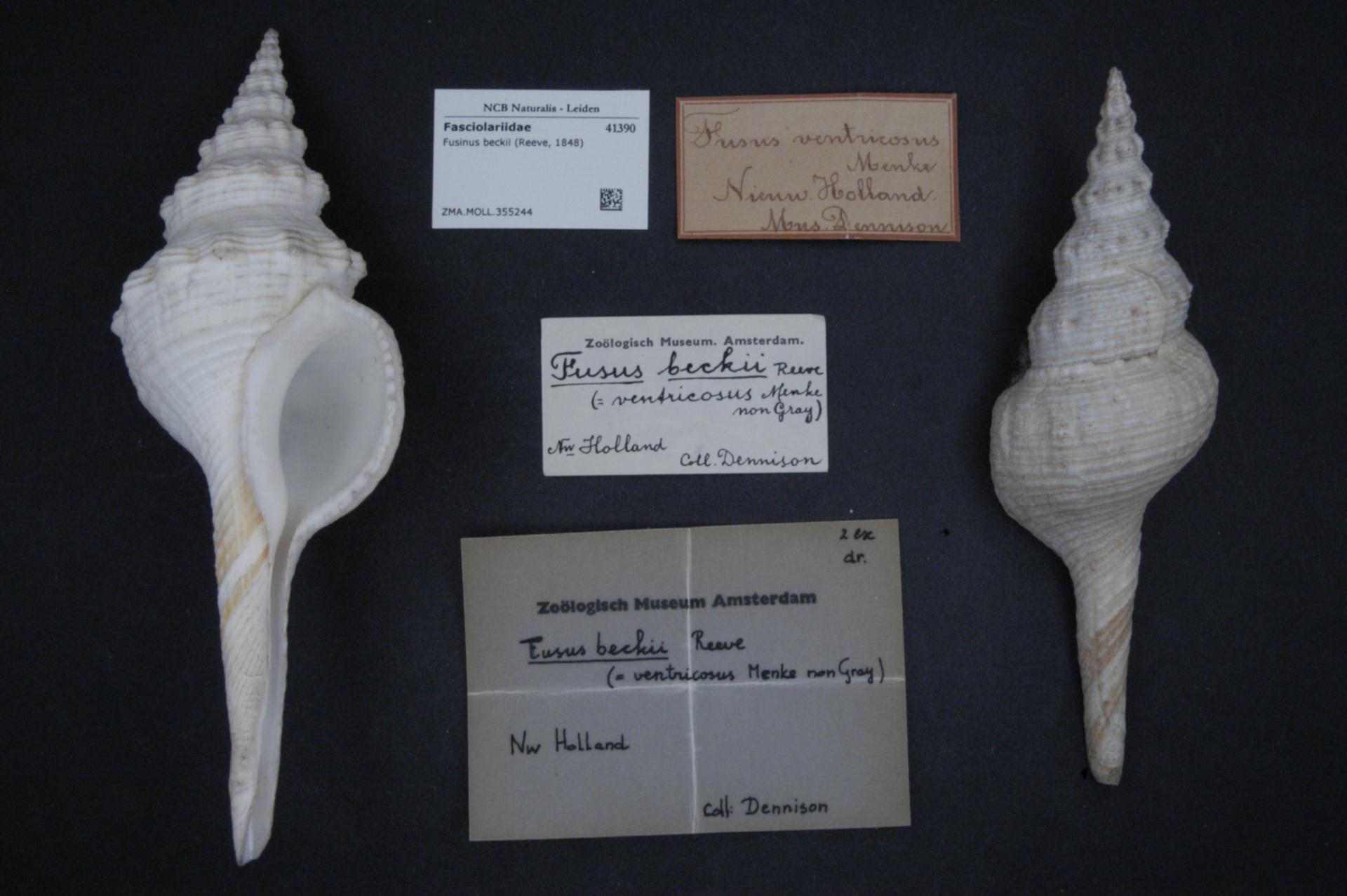

Scientific classification
- Kingdom: Animalia
- Phylum: Mollusca
- Class: Gastropoda
- Subclass: Caenogastropoda
- Order: Neogastropoda
- Family: Fasciolariidae
- Genus: Enigmofusus
- Species: E. beckii

Binomial name
- Enigmofusus beckii (Reeve, 1848)

Synonyms
- Fusinus beckii (Reeve, 1848); Fusus beckii Reeve, 1848; Fusus ventricosus Reeve, 1847 (invalid: junior homonym of Fusus ventricosus Gray, 1839; F. beckii is a replacement name)

= Enigmofusus beckii =

Species of gastropod

Enigmofusus beckii is a species of sea snail, a marine gastropod mollusk in the family Fasciolariidae, the spindle snails, the tulip snails and their allies.
