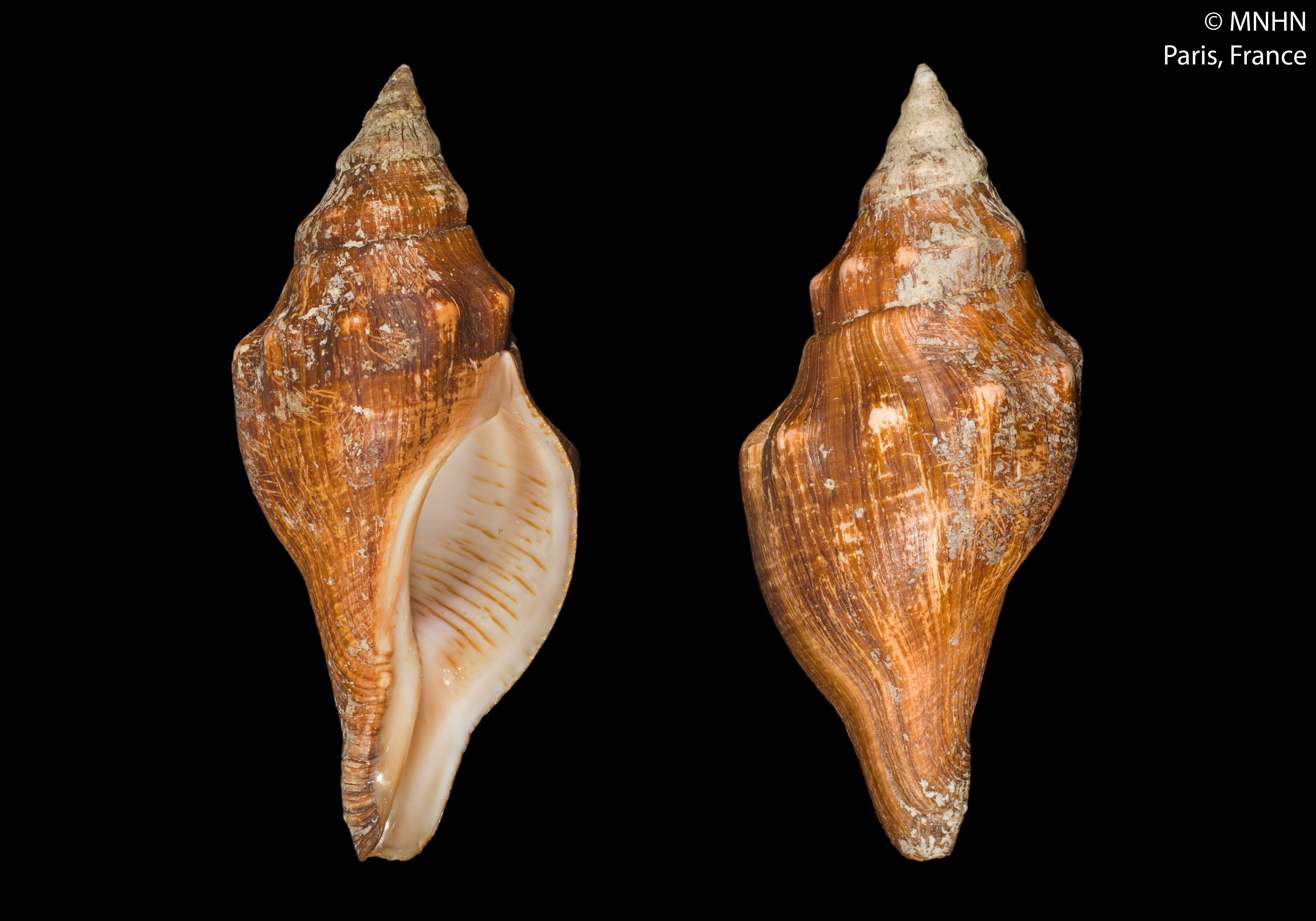
- Shell of Pleuroploca lyonsi (holotype at MNHN, Paris)

Scientific classification
- Kingdom: Animalia
- Phylum: Mollusca
- Class: Gastropoda
- Subclass: Caenogastropoda
- Order: Neogastropoda
- Superfamily: Buccinoidea
- Family: Fasciolariidae
- Genus: Pleuroploca
- Species: P. lyonsi

Binomial name
- Pleuroploca lyonsi Bozzetti, 2008

= Pleuroploca lyonsi =

Species of gastropod

Pleuroploca lyonsi is a species of sea snail, a marine gastropod mollusk in the family Fasciolariidae, the spindle snails, the tulip snails and their allies.

== Description ==
The length attains 140.6 mm.

== Distribution ==
This marine species occurs off Madagascar.
