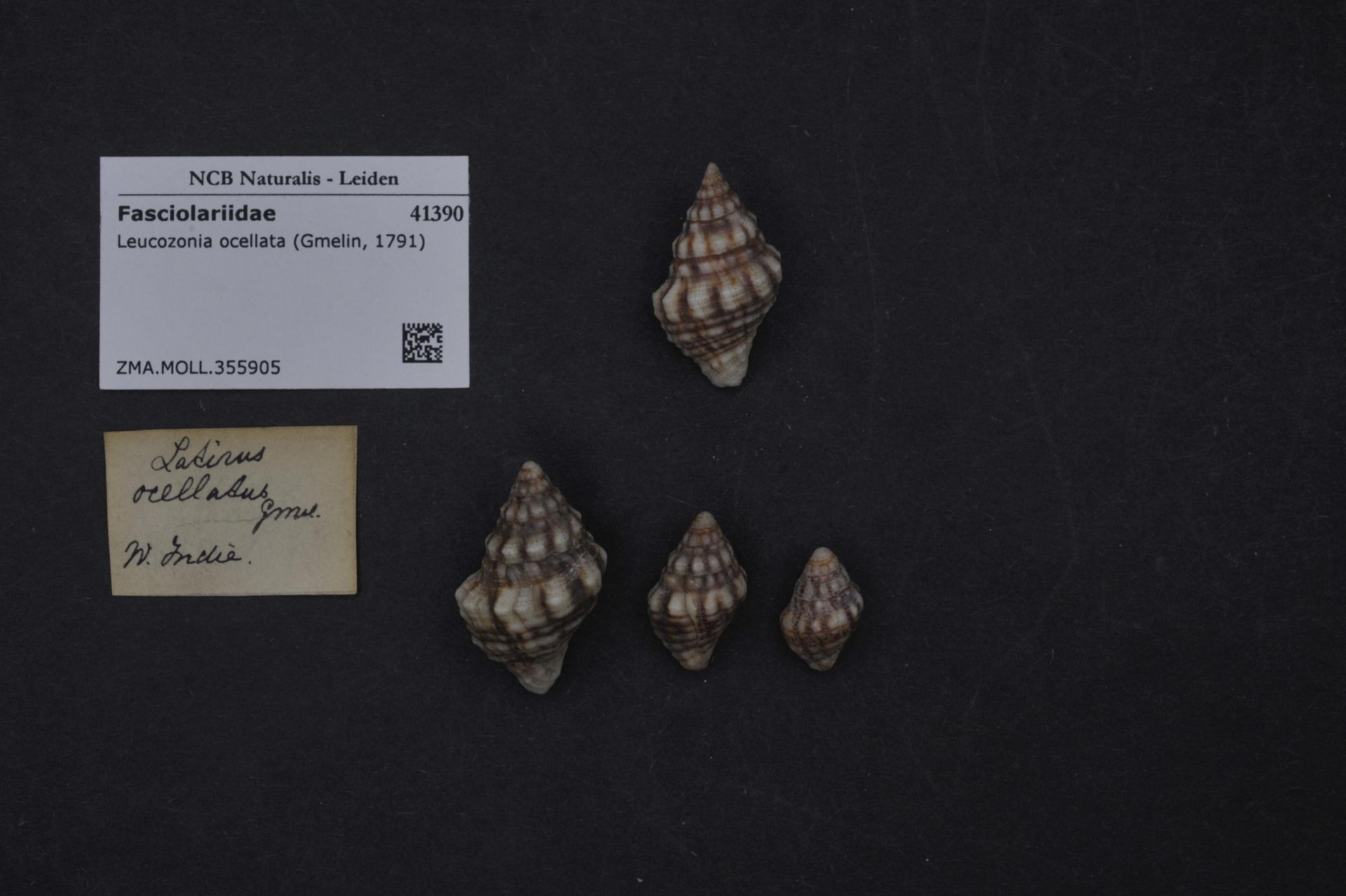

Scientific classification
- Kingdom: Animalia
- Phylum: Mollusca
- Class: Gastropoda
- Subclass: Caenogastropoda
- Order: Neogastropoda
- Family: Fasciolariidae
- Genus: Leucozonia
- Species: L. ocellata

Binomial name
- Leucozonia ocellata (Gmelin, 1791)

Synonyms
- Buccinum ocellatum Gmelin, 1791

= Leucozonia ocellata =

Species of gastropod

Leucozonia ocellata is a species of sea snail, a marine gastropod mollusk in the family Fasciolariidae, the spindle snails, the tulip snails and their allies.
