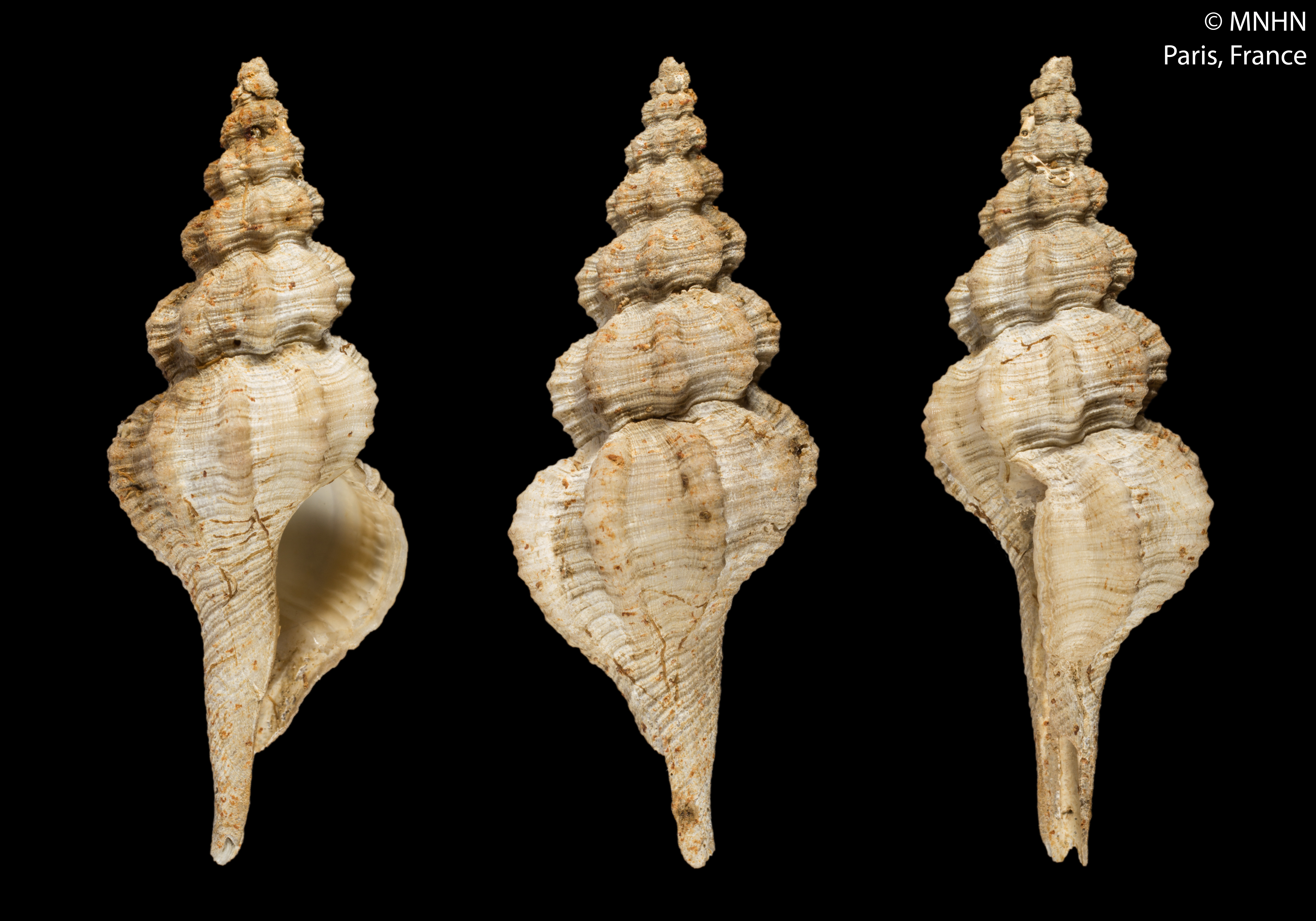
- Shell of Vermeijius virginiae (paratype at MNHN, Paris)

Scientific classification
- Kingdom: Animalia
- Phylum: Mollusca
- Class: Gastropoda
- Subclass: Caenogastropoda
- Order: Neogastropoda
- Family: Fasciolariidae
- Genus: Vermeijius
- Species: V. virginiae

Binomial name
- Vermeijius virginiae (Hadorn & Fraussen, 2002)

Synonyms
- Fusinus virginiae Hadorn & Fraussen, 2002 (original combination)

= Vermeijius virginiae =

Species of gastropod

Vermeijius virginiae is a species of sea snail, a marine gastropod mollusk in the family Fasciolariidae, the spindle snails, the tulip snails and their allies.

== Distribution ==
This marine species occurs in the Mozambique Channel.
