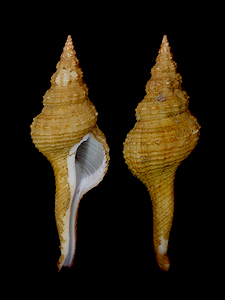

Scientific classification
- Kingdom: Animalia
- Phylum: Mollusca
- Class: Gastropoda
- Subclass: Caenogastropoda
- Order: Neogastropoda
- Family: Fasciolariidae
- Genus: Lyonsifusus
- Species: L. ansatus

Binomial name
- Lyonsifusus ansatus (Gmelin, 1791)

Synonyms
- Fusinus (Fusinus) frailensis Macsotay & Campos, 2001; Fusinus (Fusinus) martinezi Macsotay & Campos, 2001; Fusinus ansatus (Gmelin, 1791); Fusinus caboblanquensis Weisbord, 1962; Fusinus closter (Philippi, 1850); † Fusinus closter caboblanquensis Weisbord, 1962; Fusinus frailensis Macsotay & Campos, 2001; Fusinus martinezi Macsotay & Campos, 2001; Fusus closter Philippi, 1850; Fusus distans Lamarck, 1822; Fusus torulosus Lamarck, 1816; Murex ansatus Gmelin, 1791 (original combination); Murex striatulus Gmelin, 1791; Murex versicolor Gmelin, 1791 (uncertain synonym); Syrinx maculata Röding, 1798 (objective synonym)

= Lyonsifusus ansatus =

Species of mollusc

Lyonsifusus ansatus is a species of sea snail, a marine gastropod mollusc in the family Fasciolariidae, the spindle snails, the tulip snails and their allies.
