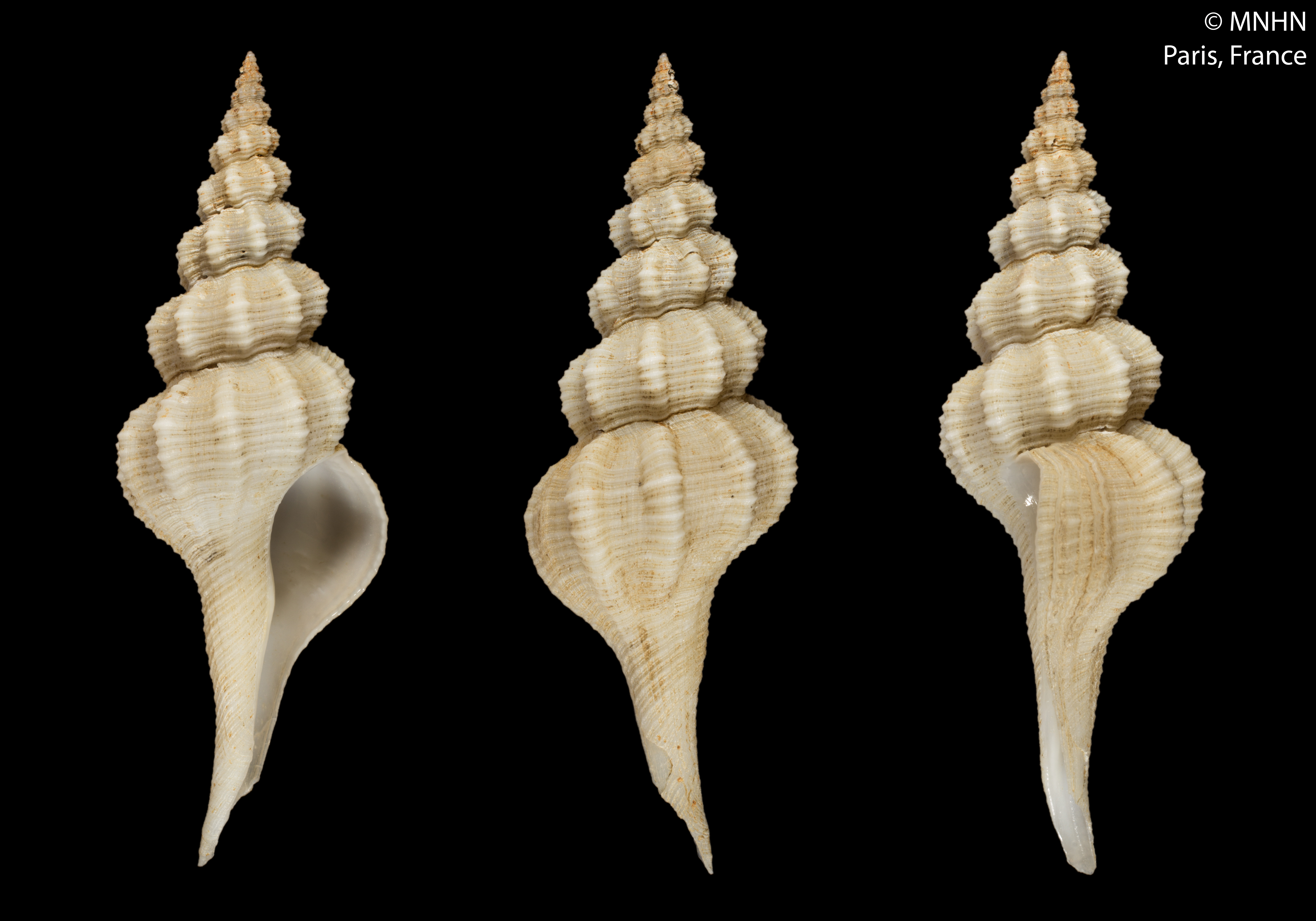
- Shell of Vermeijius virginiae (holotype at MNHN, Paris)

Scientific classification
- Kingdom: Animalia
- Phylum: Mollusca
- Class: Gastropoda
- Subclass: Caenogastropoda
- Order: Neogastropoda
- Superfamily: Buccinoidea
- Family: Fasciolariidae
- Genus: Vermeijius; Kantor, Fedosov, Snyder & Bouchet, 2018

Type species
- Pseudolatirus pallidus Kuroda & Habe, 1961

= Vermeijius =

Genus of gastropods

Vermeijius is a genus of sea snails in the subfamily Fusininae of the family Fasciolariidae.

It has been named in honour of Geerat J. Vermeij.

== Species ==
Species within the genus Vermeijius include:

- Vermeijius guidonis (Delsaerdt, 1995)
- Vermeijius insperatus Hadorn & Fraussen, 2024
- Vermeijius pallidus (Kuroda & Habe, 1961)
- Vermeijius palmarium (Hadorn & Fraussen, 2006)
- Vermeijius retiarius (E. von Martens, 1901)
- Vermeijius virginiae (Hadorn & Fraussen, 2002)
- Vermeijius wallacei (Hadorn & Fraussen, 2006)
