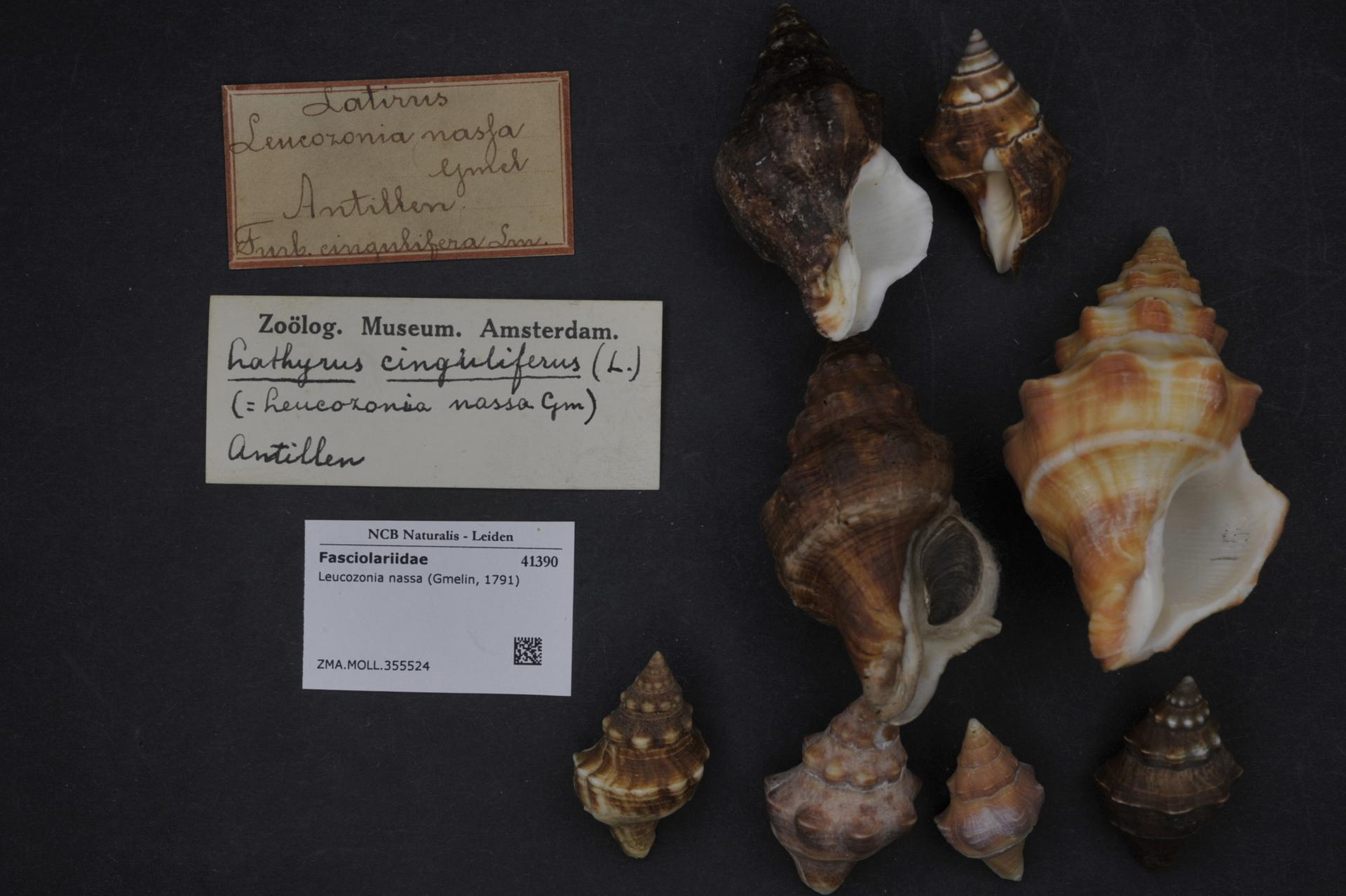

Scientific classification
- Kingdom: Animalia
- Phylum: Mollusca
- Class: Gastropoda
- Subclass: Caenogastropoda
- Order: Neogastropoda
- Family: Fasciolariidae
- Genus: Leucozonia
- Species: L. nassa

Binomial name
- Leucozonia nassa (Gmelin, 1791)

Synonyms
- Murex nassa Gmelin, 1791; Voluta fuscata Gmelin, J.F., 1791; Murex rubicunda Perry, G., 1811; Fasciolaria cingulifera Lamarck, J.B.P.A. de, 1816; Turbinella knorrii Deshayes, G.P. in Deshayes, G.P. & H. Milne-Edwards, 1843; Turbinella angularis Reeve, L.A., 1847; Lagena californica Adams, A., 1853; Turbinella dubia Petit de la Saussaye, S., 1853; Peristernia inculta Gould, A.A., 1860; Leucozonia jacarusoi Petuch, E.J., 1987

= Leucozonia nassa =

Species of gastropod

Leucozonia nassa, common name: the chestnut nassa, is a species of sea snail, a marine gastropod mollusk in the family Fasciolariidae, the spindle snails, the tulip snails and their allies.

== Description ==
The shell size varies between 22 mm and 68 mm.

== Distribution ==
This species is distributed in the Gulf of Mexico, the Caribbean Sea and the Lesser Antilles; in the Atlantic Ocean it is distributed from North Carolina to Central Brazil.
