= Lyonsifusus carvalhoriosi =

Scientific classification
- Kingdom: Animalia
- Phylum: Mollusca
- Class: Gastropoda
- Subclass: Caenogastropoda
- Order: Neogastropoda
- Family: Fasciolariidae
- Genus: Lyonsifusus
- Species: L. carvalhoriosi

Binomial name
- Lyonsifusus carvalhoriosi (Mascotay & Campos, 2001)

Synonyms
- Fusinus (Fusinus) carvalhoriosi Macsotay & Campos, 2001 (basionym); Fusinus carvalhoriosi Macsotay & Campos, 2001 (original combination)

Species of gastropod

Lyonsifusus carvalhoriosi is a species of sea snail, a marine gastropod mollusc in the family Fasciolariidae, the spindle snails, the tulip snails and their allies.
