= Leucozonia granulilabris =

Scientific classification
- Kingdom: Animalia
- Phylum: Mollusca
- Class: Gastropoda
- Subclass: Caenogastropoda
- Order: Neogastropoda
- Family: Fasciolariidae
- Genus: Leucozonia
- Species: L. granulilabris

Binomial name
- Leucozonia granulilabris (Vermeij & Snyder, 2004)

Synonyms
- Pleuroploca granulilabris Vermeij & Snyder, 2004

Species of gastropod

Leucozonia granulilabris is a species of sea snail, a marine gastropod mollusk in the family Fasciolariidae, the spindle snails, the tulip snails and their allies.
