= Viridifusus mollis =

Scientific classification
- Kingdom: Animalia
- Phylum: Mollusca
- Class: Gastropoda
- Subclass: Caenogastropoda
- Order: Neogastropoda
- Family: Fasciolariidae
- Genus: Viridifusus
- Species: V. mollis

Binomial name
- Viridifusus mollis (G.B. Sowerby III, 1913)

Synonyms
- Fusus mollis G.B. Sowerby III, 1913; Latirus mollis (G. B. Sowerby III, 1913)

Species of gastropod

Viridifusus mollis is a species of sea snail, a marine gastropod mollusk in the family Fasciolariidae, the spindle snails, the tulip snails and their allies.
