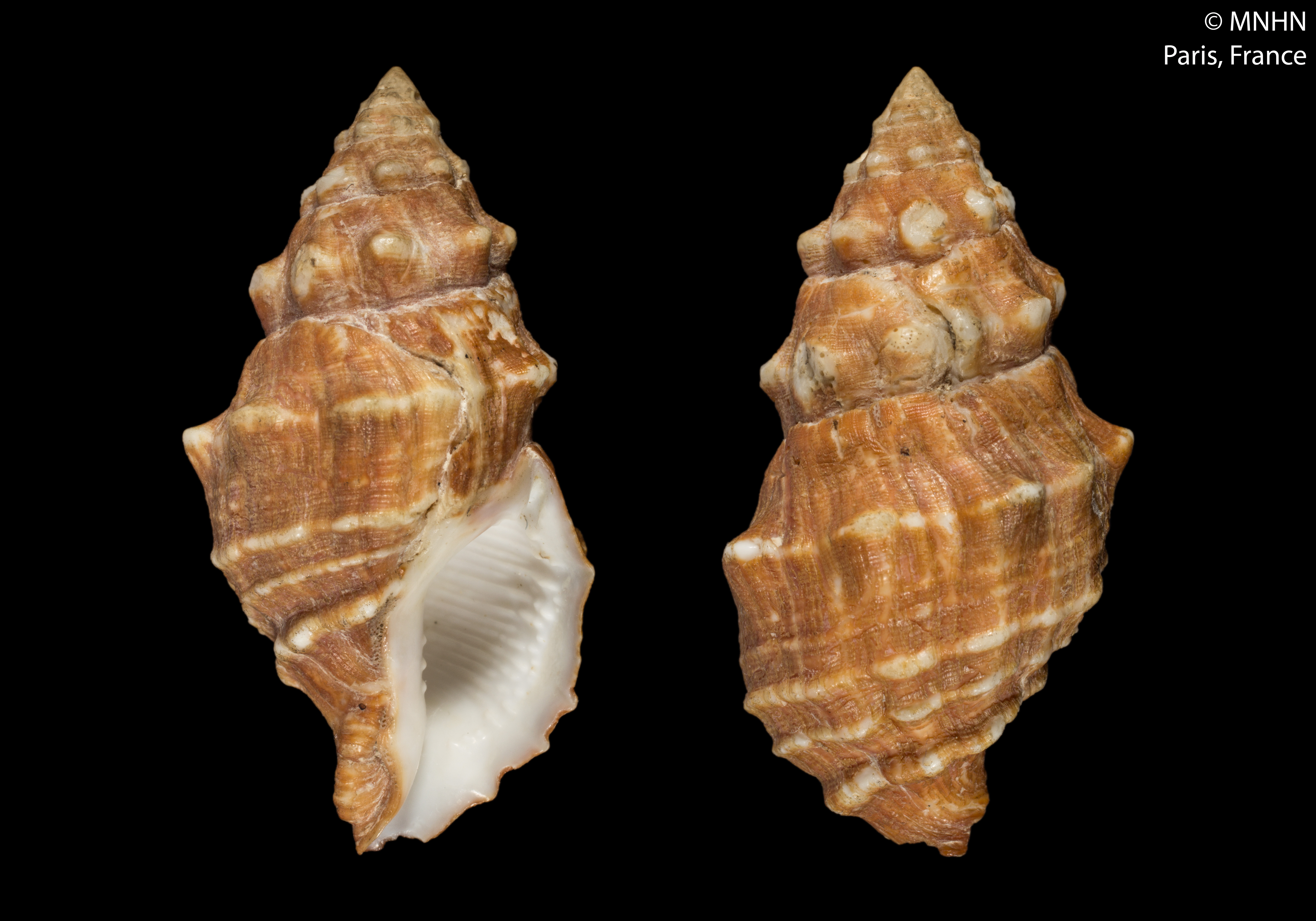
- Shell of Leucozonia triserialis (syntype at MNHN, Paris)

Scientific classification
- Kingdom: Animalia
- Phylum: Mollusca
- Class: Gastropoda
- Subclass: Caenogastropoda
- Order: Neogastropoda
- Family: Fasciolariidae
- Genus: Leucozonia
- Species: L. triserialis

Binomial name
- Leucozonia triserialis (Lamarck, 1822)

Synonyms
- Turbinella hidalgoi Crosse, 1865; Turbinella triserialis Lamarck, 1822

= Leucozonia triserialis =

Species of gastropod

Leucozonia triserialis is a species of sea snail, a marine gastropod mollusk in the family Fasciolariidae, the spindle snails, the tulip snails and their allies.

== Description ==
The length of the shell attains 45 mm.
