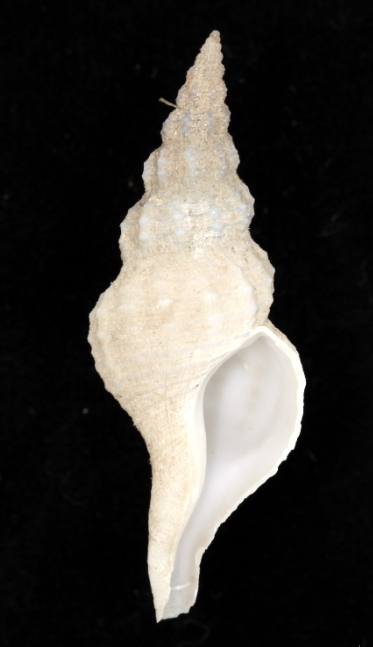
- Shell of Vermeijius retiarius (specimen at MNHN, Paris)

Scientific classification
- Kingdom: Animalia
- Phylum: Mollusca
- Class: Gastropoda
- Subclass: Caenogastropoda
- Order: Neogastropoda
- Family: Fasciolariidae
- Genus: Vermeijius
- Species: V. retiarus

Binomial name
- Vermeijius retiarus (von Martens, 1901)

Synonyms
- Fusinus retiarus (von Martens, 1901); Fusus retiarus von Martens, 1901

= Vermeijius retiarius =

Species of gastropod

Vermeijius retiarus is a species of sea snail, a marine gastropod mollusk in the family Fasciolariidae, the spindle snails, the tulip snails and their allies.

== Description ==
The shell has a tubiform shape, with a curved spire and apex, and a unique curved aperture. The length of the shell attains 56 mm.

== Distribution ==
This marine species occurs in the Indian Ocean off Somalia and Madagascar.
