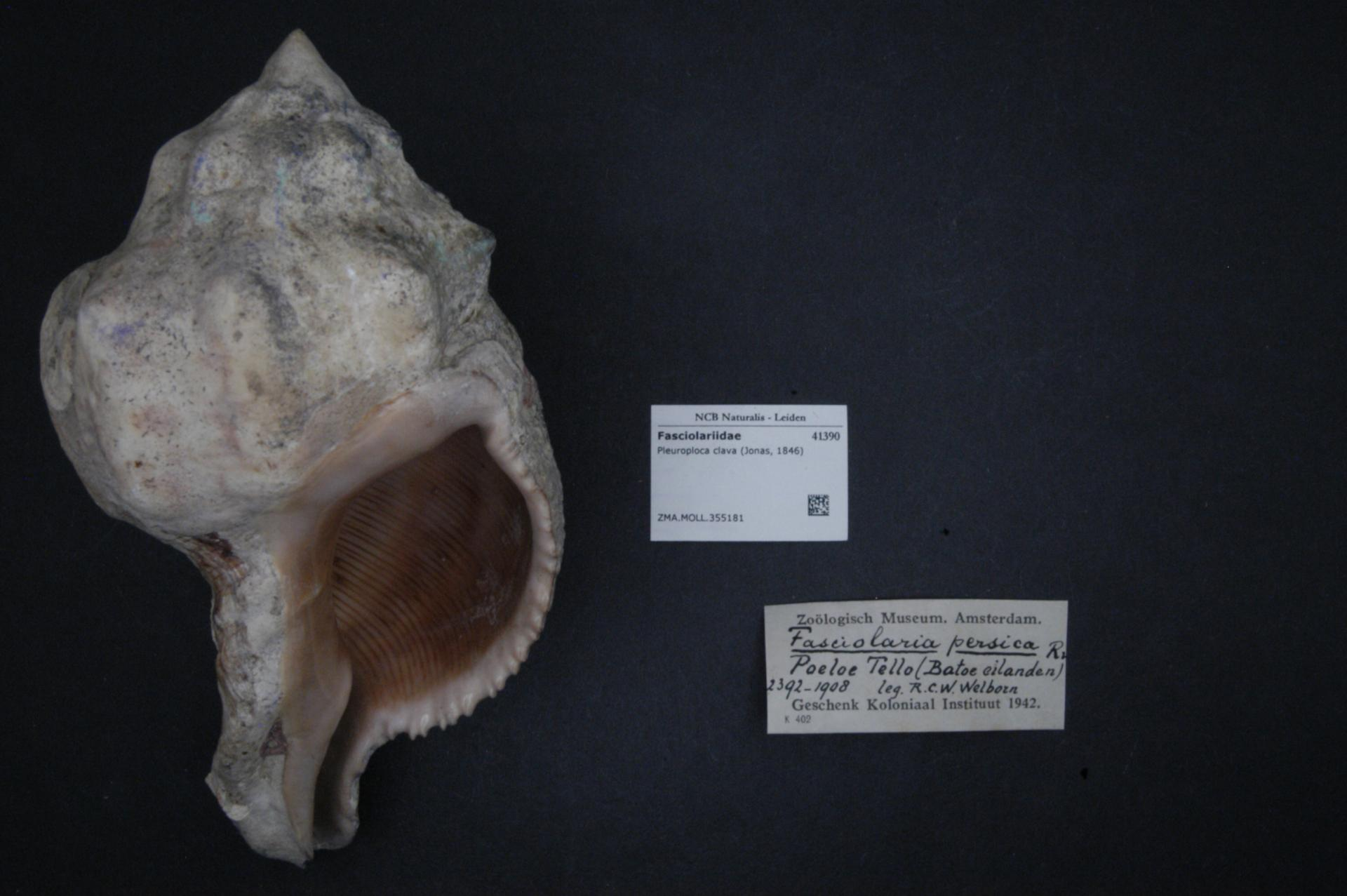
- Pleuroploca clava - preserved specimen

Scientific classification
- Kingdom: Animalia
- Phylum: Mollusca
- Class: Gastropoda
- Subclass: Caenogastropoda
- Order: Neogastropoda
- Family: Fasciolariidae
- Genus: Pleuroploca
- Species: P. clava

Binomial name
- Pleuroploca clava (Jonas, 1846)

Synonyms
- Fasciolaria clava Jonas, 1846 Pleuroploca persica Reeve, 1847

= Pleuroploca clava =

Species of gastropod

Pleuroploca clava, the Persian horse conch is a species of sea snail, a marine gastropod mollusc in the family Fasciolariidae, the spindle snails, the tulip snails and their allies.

== Distribution ==
This species occurs in Sri Lanka, Indian Ocean.
