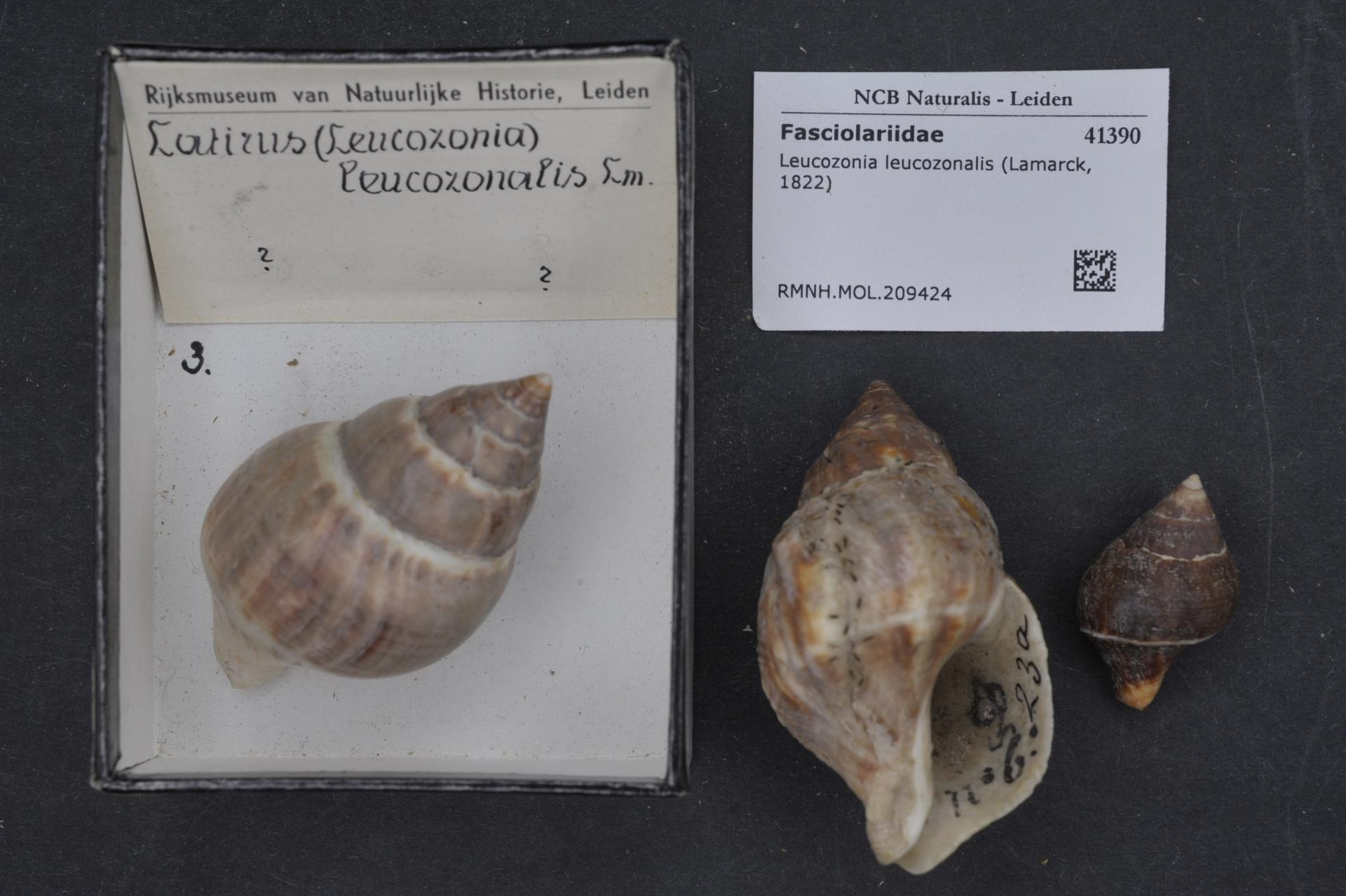
- Preserved specimen - Leucozonia leucozonalis (Lamarck, 1822)

Scientific classification
- Kingdom: Animalia
- Phylum: Mollusca
- Class: Gastropoda
- Subclass: Caenogastropoda
- Order: Neogastropoda
- Family: Fasciolariidae
- Genus: Leucozonia
- Species: L. leucozonalis

Binomial name
- Leucozonia leucozonalis (Lamarck, 1822)

Synonyms
- Leucozonia nassa leucozonalis (Lamarck, 1822) ·; Turbinella leucozonalis Lamarck, 1822

= Leucozonia leucozonalis =

Species of gastropod

Leucozonia leucozonalis is a species of sea snail, a marine gastropod mollusk in the family Fasciolariidae, the spindle snails, the tulip snails and their allies.

== Distribution ==
Cuba, Hispaniola, and Grand Cayman Island (Abbott, 1958).
