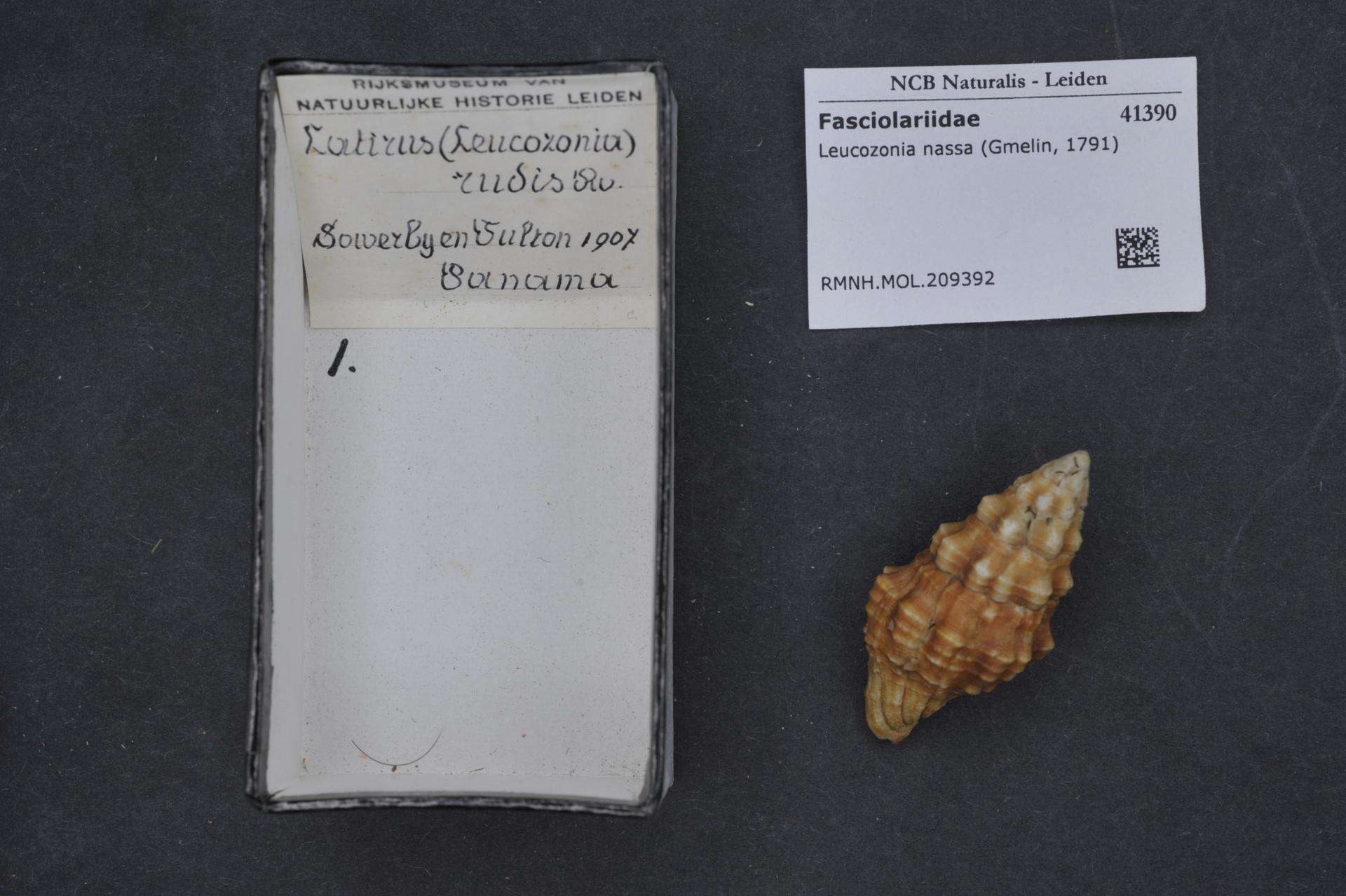

Scientific classification
- Kingdom: Animalia
- Phylum: Mollusca
- Class: Gastropoda
- Subclass: Caenogastropoda
- Order: Neogastropoda
- Family: Fasciolariidae
- Genus: Leucozonia
- Species: L. rudis

Binomial name
- Leucozonia rudis (Reeve, 1847)

Synonyms
- Turbinella rudis Reeve, 1847

= Leucozonia rudis =

Species of gastropod

Leucozonia rudis is a species of sea snail, a marine gastropod mollusk in the family Fasciolariidae, the spindle snails, the tulip snails and their allies.
