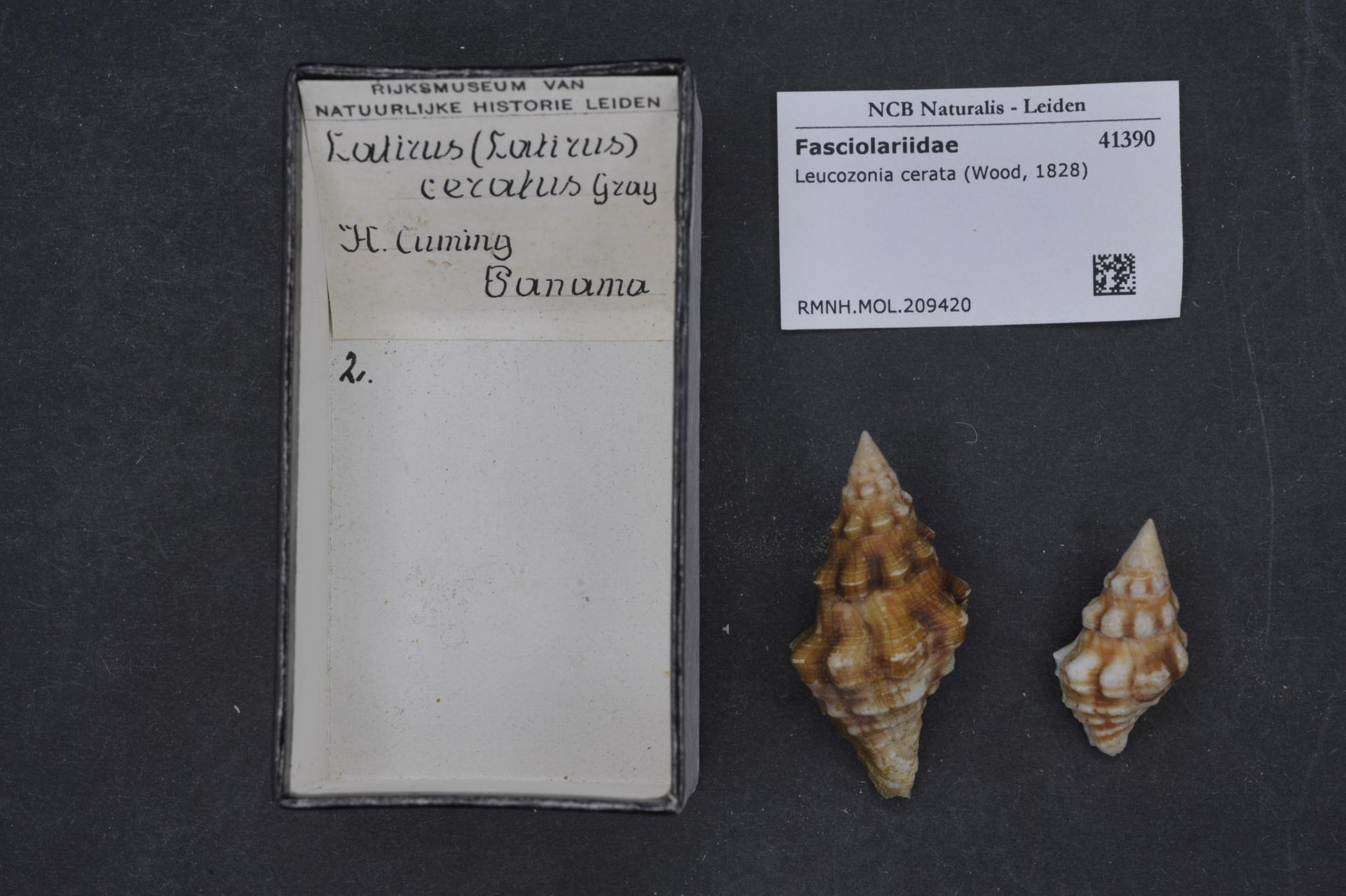

Scientific classification
- Kingdom: Animalia
- Phylum: Mollusca
- Class: Gastropoda
- Subclass: Caenogastropoda
- Order: Neogastropoda
- Family: Fasciolariidae
- Genus: Leucozonia
- Species: L. cerata

Binomial name
- Leucozonia cerata (Wood, 1828)

Synonyms
- Murex cerata Wood, 1828

= Leucozonia cerata =

Species of gastropod

Leucozonia cerata is a species of sea snail, a marine gastropod mollusk in the family Fasciolariidae, the spindle snails, the tulip snails and their allies.
