= Enigmofusus nicki =

Scientific classification
- Kingdom: Animalia
- Phylum: Mollusca
- Class: Gastropoda
- Subclass: Caenogastropoda
- Order: Neogastropoda
- Family: Fasciolariidae
- Genus: Enigmofusus
- Species: E. nicki

Binomial name
- Enigmofusus nicki (Snyder, 2002)

Synonyms
- Fusinus nicki Snyder, 2002 (original combination)

Species of gastropod

Enigmofusus nicki is a species of sea snail, a marine gastropod mollusc in the family Fasciolariidae, the spindle snails, the tulip snails and their allies.

== Distribution ==
This marine species occurs off Mozambique.
