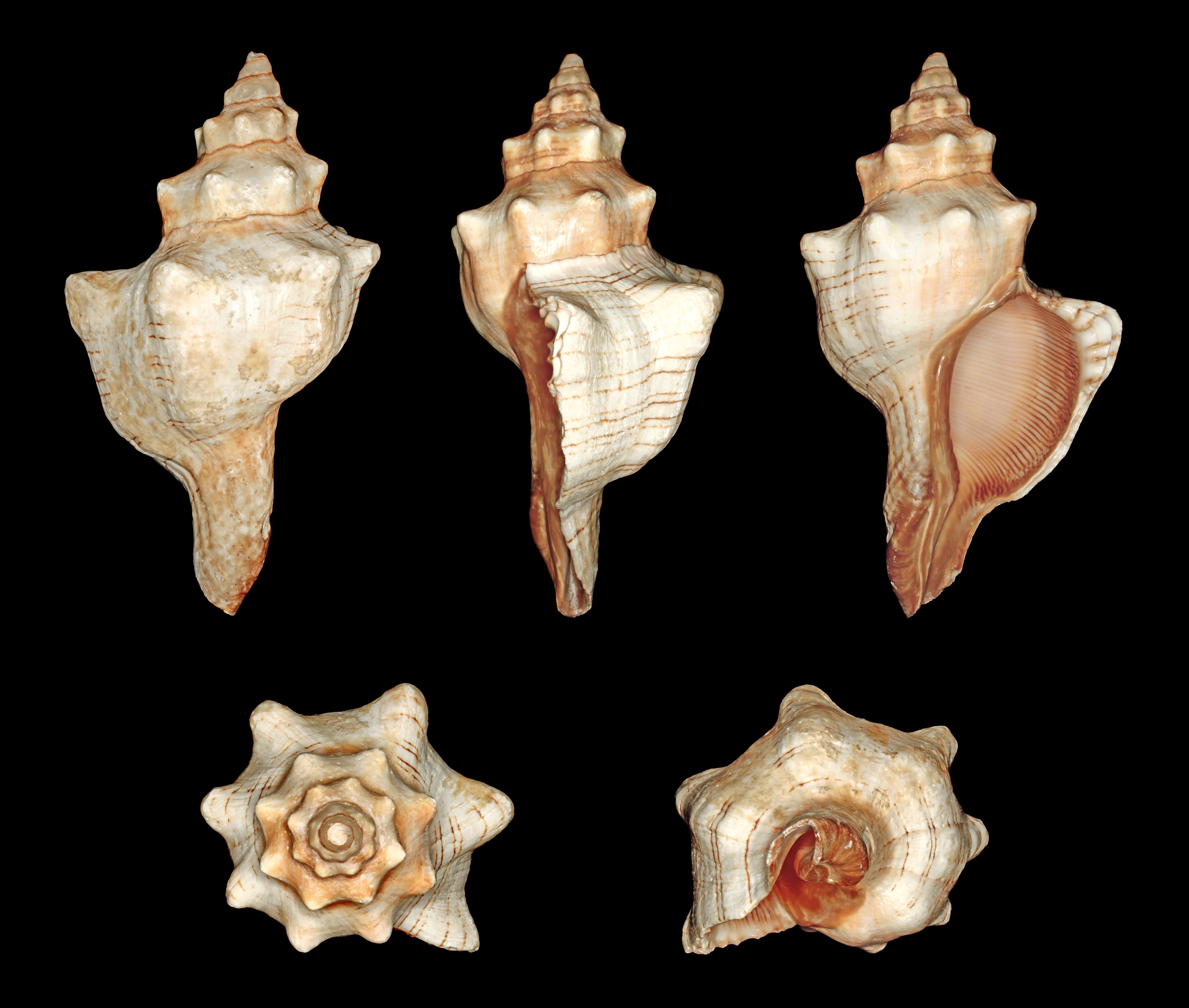
- Pleuroploca trapezium

Scientific classification
- Kingdom: Animalia
- Phylum: Mollusca
- Class: Gastropoda
- Subclass: Caenogastropoda
- Order: Neogastropoda
- Family: Fasciolariidae
- Genus: Pleuroploca
- Species: P. trapezium

Binomial name
- Pleuroploca trapezium (Linnaeus, 1758)

Synonyms
- Fasciolaria lineata G. Perry, 1811; Fasciolaria ferruginea Lamarck, 1822; Fasciolaria ponderosa J. H. Jonas, in R. A. Philippi, 1851; Fasciolaria lischkeana R. W. Dunker, 1863; Fasciolaria trapezium (Linnaeus, 1758); Fasciolaria audouini gracilior (f) Tapparone-Canefri, 1875; Murex trapezium Linnaeus, 1758

= Pleuroploca trapezium =

Species of gastropod

Pleuroploca trapezium, common name : the trapezium horse conch or striped fox conch, is a species of sea snail, a marine gastropod mollusk in the family Fasciolariidae, the spindle snails, the tulip snails and their allies.

This species is sought after for food but also to be used as a trumpet when the tip of the spire is cut off.

== Subspecies and formae ==
- Subspecies Pleuroploca trapezium audouini (Jonas, 1846)
- Forma Pleuroploca trapezium f. intermedia (Kobelt, 1875)
- Forma Pleuroploca trapezium f. paeteli (Strebel, 1911)

== Description ==
The golden brown shell is solid and heavy. Its shell size varies between 85 mm and 250 mm with a common length of 200 mm. The spire is of moderate length. The apex is usually eroded. The sutures are constricted. The shoulders on the whorls are covered with spiral rows of slightly pointed strong nodules. The surface is covered with fine, brown, incised spiral lines, mainly in pairs. The outer lip is dentate with seven pairs of teeth, situated where the paired lines meet the edge. The oval aperture is pale with strong ridges internally. The columella is smooth posteriorly. The siphonal canal is extended and short. The fasciole is weak.

Pleuroploca trapezium has been observed preying on the spiny cerith (Cerithium echinatum) in the Seychelles.

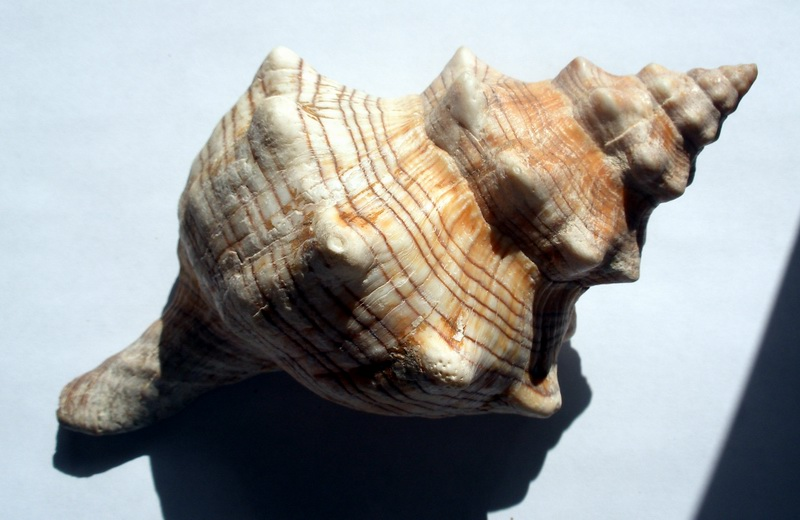
Pleuroploca trapezium, apertural view

== Distribution ==
This species is distributed in the Red Sea and in the Indian Ocean along Aldabra Atolls of Seychelles, Madagascar, Mauritius, Mozambique, Réunion (France), South Africa and Tanzania; in the Pacific Ocean from Japan down to Melanesia, New Caledonia (France) and North Queensland but rarely along Australian coasts.

== Habitat ==
This species can be found in the benthic zone on seagrass beds at depths between 0 – 40 m.
