= Granolaria salmo =

Scientific classification
- Kingdom: Animalia
- Phylum: Mollusca
- Class: Gastropoda
- Subclass: Caenogastropoda
- Order: Neogastropoda
- Family: Fasciolariidae
- Genus: Granolaria
- Species: G. salmo

Binomial name
- Granolaria salmo (Wood, 1828)

Synonyms
- Murex salmo Wood, 1828 (original combination); Pleuroploca salmo (Wood, 1828)

Species of gastropod

Granolaria salmo is a species of sea snail, a marine gastropod mollusc in the family Fasciolariidae, the spindle snails, the tulip snails and their allies.
