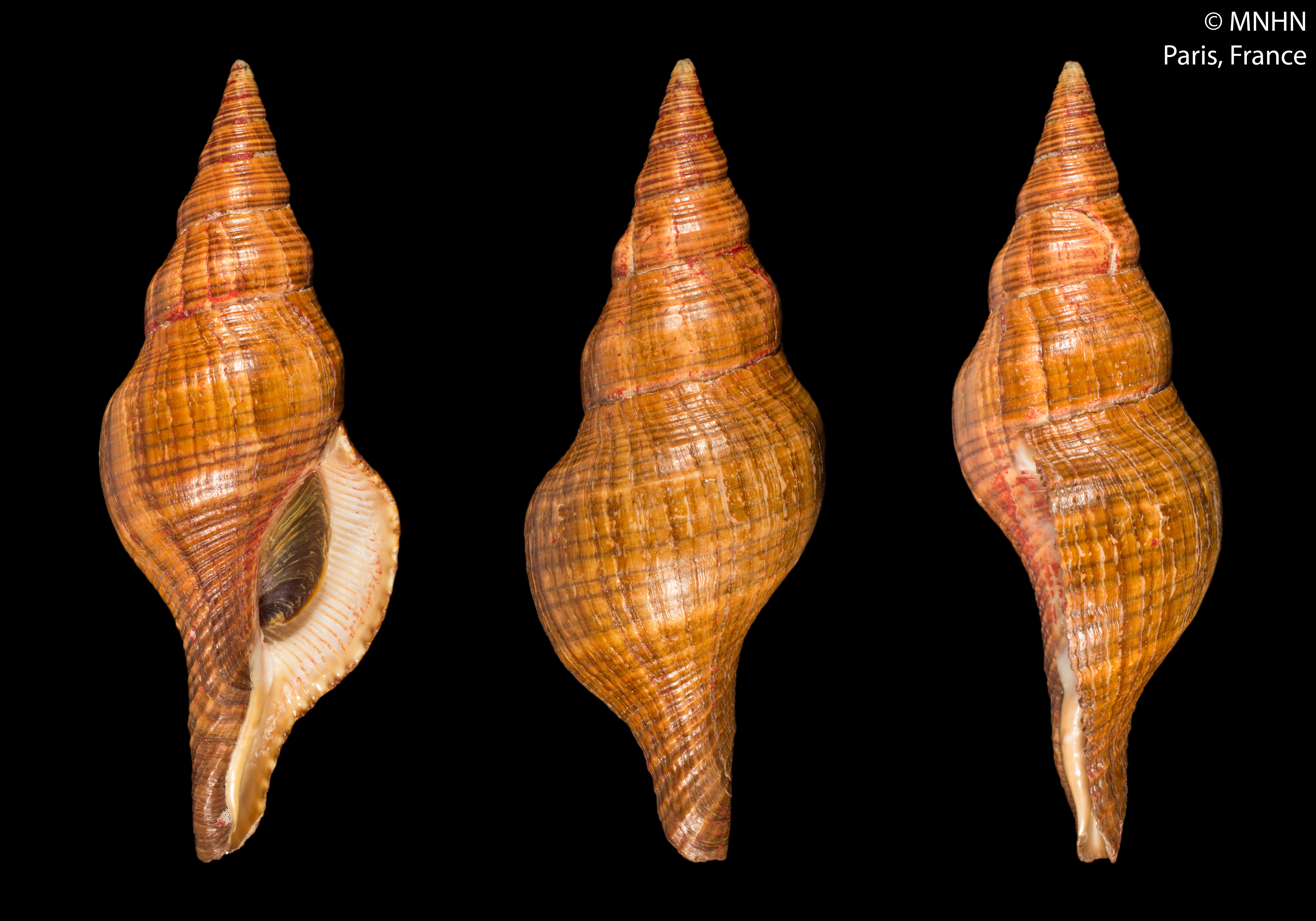
- Shell of Filifusus manuelae (holotype at MNHN, Paris)

Scientific classification
- Kingdom: Animalia
- Phylum: Mollusca
- Class: Gastropoda
- Subclass: Caenogastropoda
- Order: Neogastropoda
- Family: Fasciolariidae
- Genus: Filifusus
- Species: F. manuelae

Binomial name
- Filifusus manuelae (Bozzetti, 2008)

Synonyms
- Pleuroploca manuelae Bozzetti, 2008 (basionym)

= Filifusus manuelae =

Species of gastropod

Filifusus manuelae is a species of sea snail, a marine gastropod mollusc in the family Fasciolariidae, the spindle snails, the tulip snails and their allies.

== Description ==
The length of the shell attains 101.9 mm.

== Distribution ==
This species occurs in the Indian Ocean off Madagascar.
