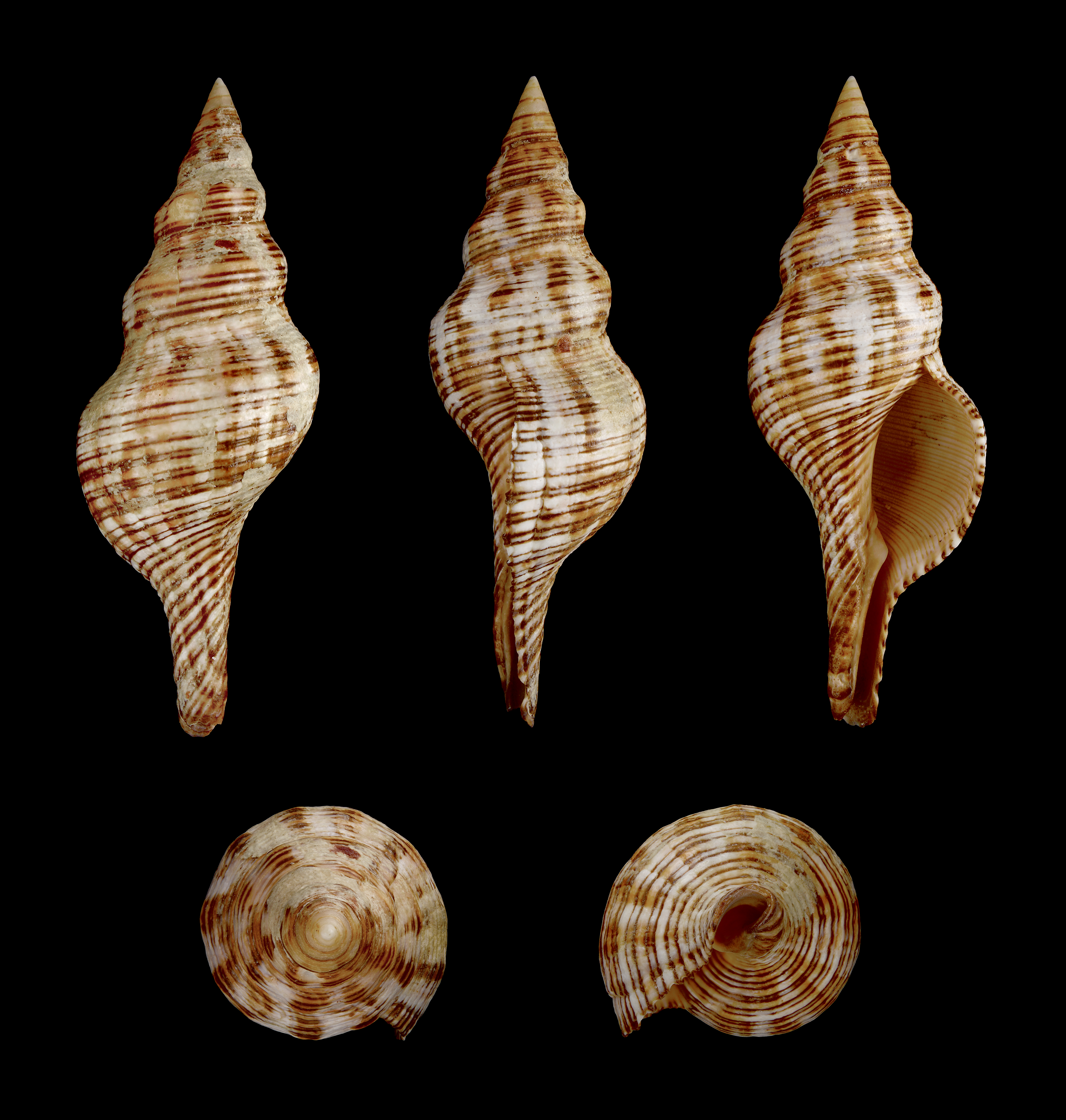
- Several views of Filifusus filamentosus

Scientific classification
- Kingdom: Animalia
- Phylum: Mollusca
- Class: Gastropoda
- Subclass: Caenogastropoda
- Order: Neogastropoda
- Family: Fasciolariidae
- Genus: Filifusus
- Species: F. filamentosus

Binomial name
- Filifusus filamentosus (Röding, 1798)

Synonyms
- Fusus filamentosa Röding, 1798 (basionym); Fasciolaria filamentosa (Röding, 1798); Pleuroploca filamentosa (Röding, 1798)

= Filifusus filamentosus =

Species of gastropod

Filifusus filamentosus is a species of sea snail, a marine gastropod mollusk in the family Fasciolariidae, the spindle snails, the tulip snails and their allies.

== Distribution ==
This species occurs in the Red Sea and in the Indian Ocean off Tanzania, Madagascar and the Mascarene Basin
