= Filifusus glaber =

Scientific classification
- Kingdom: Animalia
- Phylum: Mollusca
- Class: Gastropoda
- Subclass: Caenogastropoda
- Order: Neogastropoda
- Family: Fasciolariidae
- Genus: Filifusus
- Species: F. glaber

Binomial name
- Filifusus glaber (Dunker, 1882)

Synonyms
- Fasciolaria glabra Dunker, 1882 (original combination); Pleuroploca glabra (Dunker, 1882)

Species of gastropod

Filifusus glaber is a species of sea snail, a marine gastropod mollusk in the family Fasciolariidae, the spindle snails, the tulip snails and their allies.
