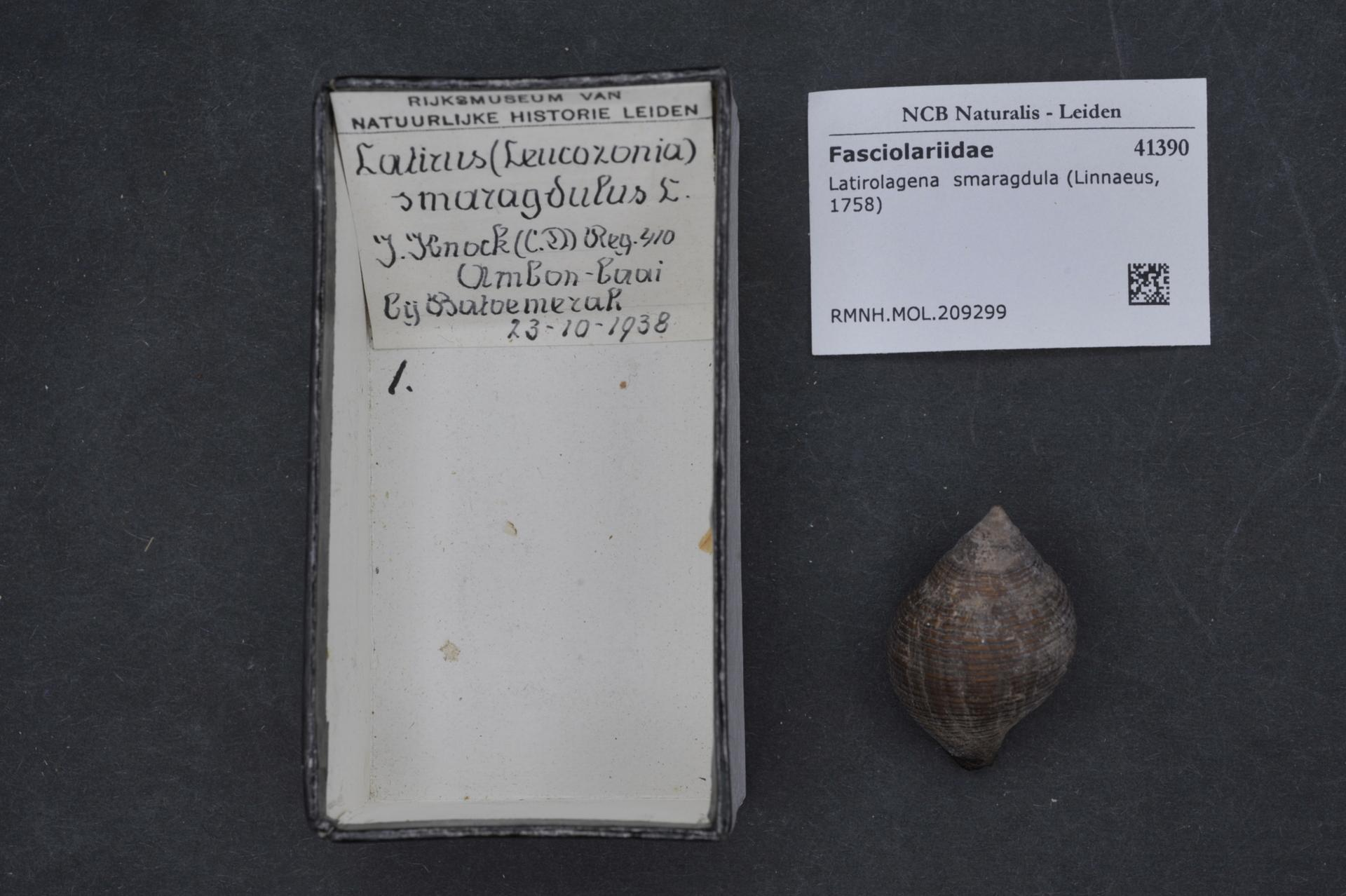

Scientific classification
- Kingdom: Animalia
- Phylum: Mollusca
- Class: Gastropoda
- Subclass: Caenogastropoda
- Order: Neogastropoda
- Family: Fasciolariidae
- Genus: Latirolagena
- Species: L. smaragdula

Binomial name
- Latirolagena smaragdula (Linnaeus, 1758)

Synonyms
- Buccinum smaragdulus Linnaeus, 1758; Leucozonia smaragdula (Linnaeus, 1758)

= Latirolagena smaragdula =

Species of gastropod

Latirolagena smaragdula is a species of sea snail, a marine gastropod mollusk in the family Fasciolariidae, the spindle snails, the tulip snails and their allies.

== Description ==
Shell size 40-45 mm.

== Distribution ==
- Aldabra
- Chagos
- Madagascar
- Mascarene Basin
- Red Sea
- Somalia.
