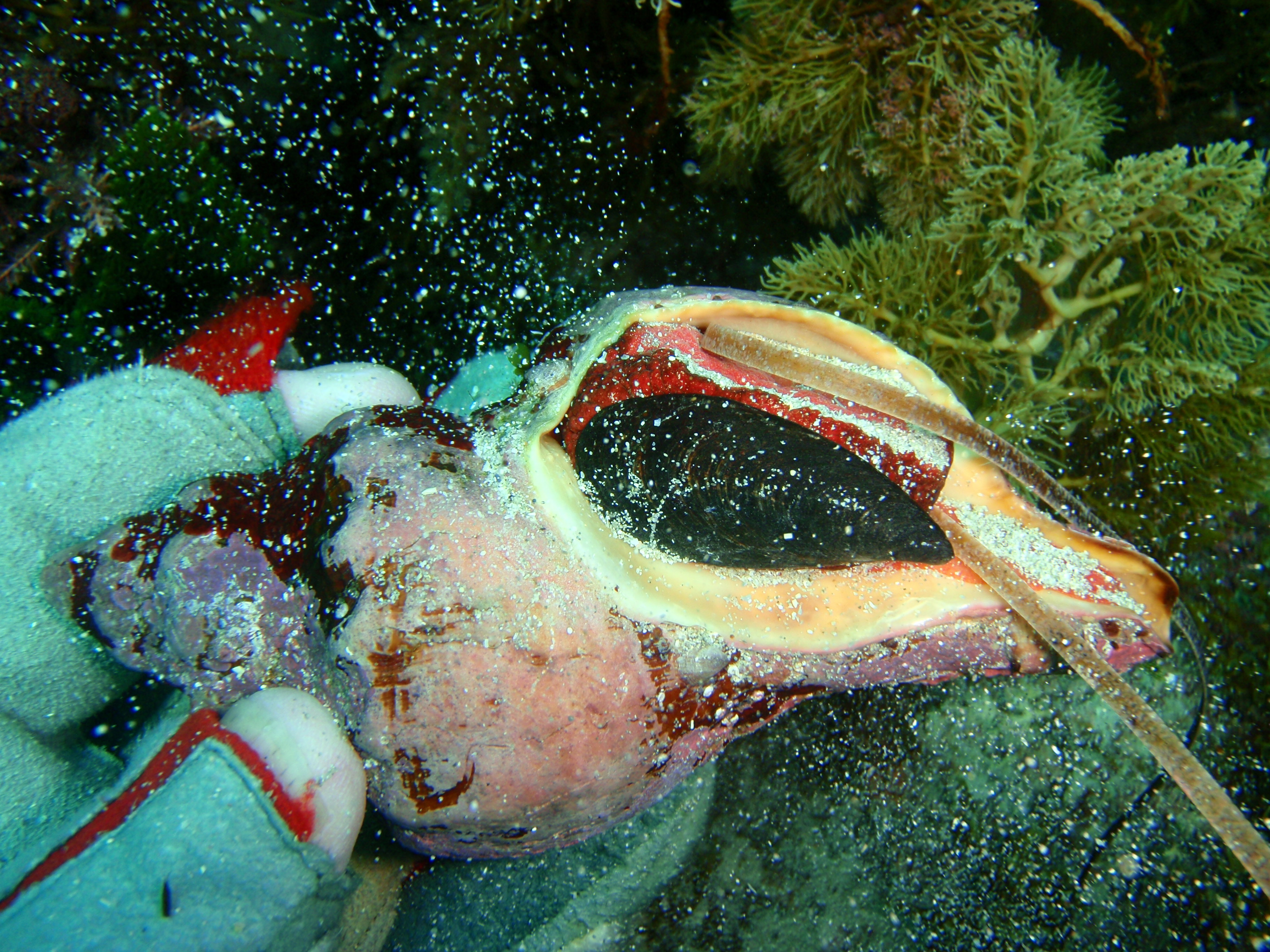

Scientific classification
- Kingdom: Animalia
- Phylum: Mollusca
- Class: Gastropoda
- Subclass: Caenogastropoda
- Order: Neogastropoda
- Family: Fasciolariidae
- Genus: Australaria
- Species: A. australasia

Binomial name
- Australaria australasia (Perry, 1811)

Synonyms
- Pleuroploca australasia (Perry, 1811); Pyrula australasia Perry, 1811 (basionym)

= Australaria australasia =

Species of gastropod

Australaria australasia is a species of sea snail, a marine gastropod mollusk in the family Fasciolariidae, the spindle snails, the tulip snails and their allies.

== Distribution ==
This species occurs in southern Australia, including the states of South Australia, Victoria, Tasmania, and probably others.
