= Aurantilaria aurantiaca =

Scientific classification
- Kingdom: Animalia
- Phylum: Mollusca
- Class: Gastropoda
- Subclass: Caenogastropoda
- Order: Neogastropoda
- Family: Fasciolariidae
- Genus: Aurantilaria
- Species: A. aurantiaca

Binomial name
- Aurantilaria aurantiaca (Lamarck, 1816)

Synonyms
- Fasciolaria aurantiaca Lamarck, 1816; Fasciolaria aurantiaca f. brunnea Strebel, 1911; Fasciolaria aurantiaca var. purpura Kobelt, 1875; Fasciolaria purpurea Jonas, 1849; Pleuroploca aurantiaca (Lamarck, 1816); Pleuroploca aurantiaca f. brunnea Strebel, 1911; Pleuroploca aurantiaca var. purpura Kobelt, 1875

Species of gastropod

Aurantilaria aurantiaca is a species of sea snail, a marine gastropod mollusk in the family Fasciolariidae, the spindle snails, the tulip snails and their allies.
