= Viridifusus maximus =

Scientific classification
- Kingdom: Animalia
- Phylum: Mollusca
- Class: Gastropoda
- Subclass: Caenogastropoda
- Order: Neogastropoda
- Family: Fasciolariidae
- Genus: Viridifusus
- Species: V. maximus

Binomial name
- Viridifusus maximus (G. B. Sowerby III, 1893)

Synonyms
- Latirus maximus G. B. Sowerby III, 1893

Species of gastropod

Viridifusus maximus is a species of sea snail, a marine gastropod mollusk in the family Fasciolariidae, the spindle snails, the tulip snails and their allies.

== Distribution ==
This species occurs in the Atlantic Ocean off the Cape Verde Archipelago.
