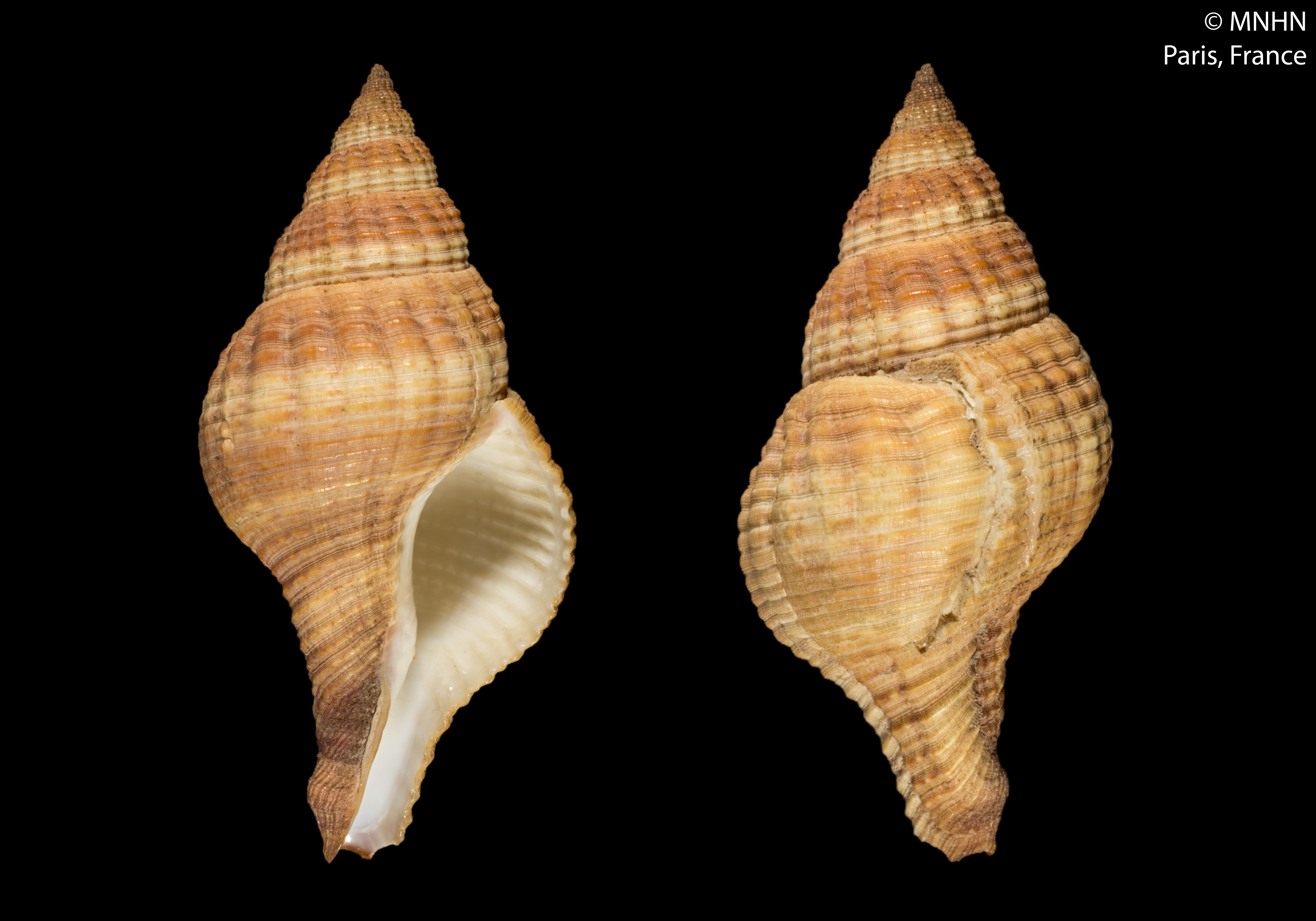

Scientific classification
- Kingdom: Animalia
- Phylum: Mollusca
- Class: Gastropoda
- Subclass: Caenogastropoda
- Order: Neogastropoda
- Family: Fasciolariidae
- Genus: Viridifusus
- Species: V. buxeus

Binomial name
- Viridifusus buxeus (Reeve, 1847)

Synonyms
- Fusinus buxeus (Reeve, 1847); Fusus buxeus Reeve, 1847 (basionym); Pleuroploca buxeus (Reeve, 1847)

= Viridifusus buxeus =

Species of gastropod

Viridifusus buxeus is a species of sea snail, a marine gastropod mollusk in the family Fasciolariidae, the spindle snails, the tulip snails and their allies.

Until 2012, it was a species of Fusinus.

== Distribution ==
This marine species occurs in the Atlantic Ocean off West Africa and the Cape Verdes.
