= Lugubrilaria lugubris =

Scientific classification
- Kingdom: Animalia
- Phylum: Mollusca
- Class: Gastropoda
- Subclass: Caenogastropoda
- Order: Neogastropoda
- Family: Fasciolariidae
- Genus: Lugubrilaria
- Species: L. lugubris

Binomial name
- Lugubrilaria lugubris (A. Adams & Reeve in Reeve, 1847)

Synonyms
- Fasciolaria lugubris A. Adam & Reeve, 1847 (basionym); Fasciolaria lugubris lugubris A. Adams & Reeve, 1847; Pleuroploca heynemanni Dunker, 1876; Pleuroploca lugubris (A. Adams & Reeve, 1847); Pleuroploca lugubris heynemanni Dunker, 1876

Species of gastropod

Lugubrilaria lugubris is a species of sea snail, a marine gastropod mollusk in the family Fasciolariidae, the spindle snails, the tulip snails and their allies.

== Distribution ==
This marine species occurs off South Africa.
