= Geerat J. Vermeij =

Dutch geology professor and malacologist (born 1946)

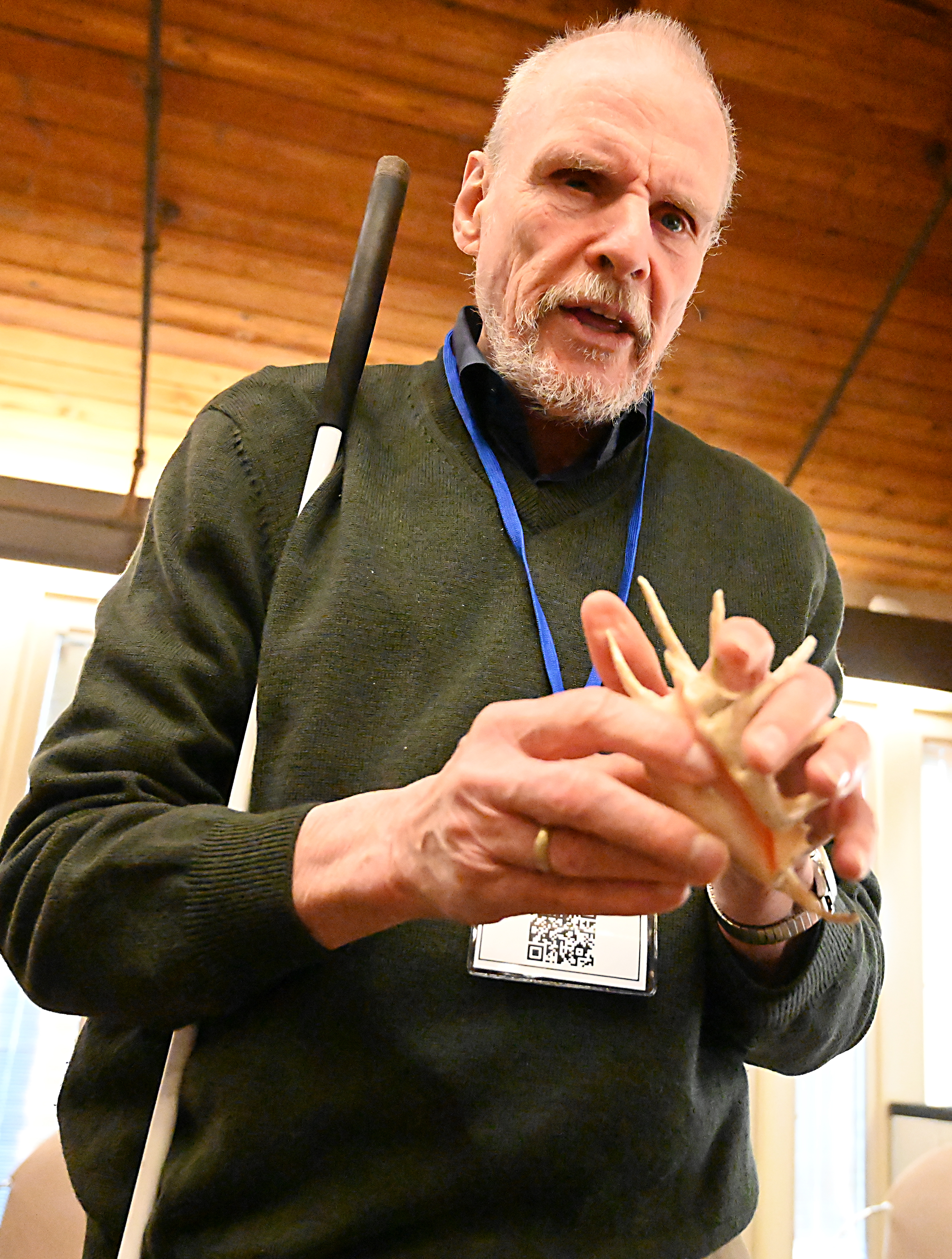
- Born: September 28, 1946; Sappemeer, Netherlands
- Education: Princeton University; Yale University
- Awards: Daniel Giraud Elliot Medal (2000); Paleontological Society Medal (2006)
- Scientific career
- Fields: Paleontology; Paleobiology
- Workplaces: University of California at Davis

Geerat J. Vermeij (born September 28, 1946) is a Dutch-born paleoecologist and evolutionary biologist in the Department of Earth and Planetary Sciences at the University of California, Davis. He studies marine molluscs, both as fossils and as living creatures, as well as influence creatures have on each other's evolutionary fates, alongside having worked on plants, crabs, extinction, biological invasions, and biogeography. He received a MacArthur Fellowship in 1992, and in 2000, was awarded the Daniel Giraud Elliot Medal from the National Academy of Sciences. He was also a fellow of the California Academy of Sciences in 1992 and was awarded the Fellows Medal from the California Academy of Sciences in 2017.

== Early life and education ==
Vermeij was born in Sappemeer, Netherlands. Blind from the age of three, he studied Braille at the Prins Alexander Stichting Boarding School in Huis Ter Heide. He moved from the Netherlands to Nutley, New Jersey at age 10, and graduated from Nutley High School in 1965. Since the age of 10, Vermeij wanted to be a conchologist. Vermeij had a school teacher who once brought shells from Florida. There were great differences in the characteristics of those shells and the ones he experienced in the Netherlands, which sparked his interest.

He has a wife, Edith Zipser, and a daughter, Hermine. His vision loss did not slow him down. He travelled the world with research assistants to retrieve shells. His interests in comparing shell traits came his senior year at Princeton University when he took a trip to both Costa Rica and Hawaii. There was a sharp contrast in the molluscs and it intrigued him. Vermeij proceeded to graduate from Princeton University in 1968 and received his Ph.D. in biology and geology from Yale University in 1971.

== Career ==
Vermeij studies coevolutionary relationships between predator and prey organisms, with a focus on marine mollusks. His research argues that an important evolutionary mechanism is the process of escalation, which occurs when species adapt to, or are limited by their competitors, predators, and parasites.

In lieu of sight, Vermeij uses his sense of touch to better understand mollusk morphology. Throughout his career, he has challenged the assumption that people with disabilities like blindness cannot conduct scientific research.

As part of his professional career, he has been a part of multiple professional societies including the American Association for the Advancement of Science, the Society for the Study of Evolution, Paleontological Society, American Society of Naturalists, the Institute of Malacology, Nederlandse Malacologische Vereniging, and Werkgroep voor Tertiaire en Kwartiaire Geologie. He was a member of the board of trustees at the California Academy of Sciences from 2006 to 2015.

Vermeij has over 300 publications and 5 published books including his first book, Biogeography and Adaptation published in 1978. He has also published Evolution and Escalation: An Ecological History of Life, A Natural History of Shells, Privileged Hands: A Scientific Life, and Nature: An Economic History, which evaluates economics and evolution. His forthcoming book is titled The Evolution of Power.

In February 2023, Distinguished Professor Emeritus Geerat Vermeij in the Department of Earth and Planetary Sciences, UC Davis, delivered the New Emeriti Distinguished Lecture, focusing on The Evolution of Power.

== Honors ==
=== Awards and memberships ===
- 1968: Phi Beta Kappa: Princeton University
- 1975-1976: Fellowship: John Simon Guggenheim Memorial Foundation
- 1981: Fellow: American Association for the Advancement of Science
- 1983: Award for Excellence in Research, Division of Agriculture and Life Science, University of Maryland
- 1984: Book Subsidy Award, General Research Board, University of Maryland
- 1992: Fellowship: John D. and Catharine T. MacArthur Foundation
- 1992: Fellow: California Academy of Sciences
- 1997: American Academy of Achievement, Golden Plate Award
- 1997: John Burroughs Society, Best Essay in Natural History
- 2001: Daniel Giraud Elliott Medal, National Academy of Sciences
- 2004: Faculty Research Lectureship, UC Davis
- 2006: Paleontological Society Medal
- 2008: Circle of Discovery, University of Maryland
- 2016: Addison Emery Verrill Medal
- 2017: Fellows Medal, California Academy of Sciences
- 2021: Elected Member, American Academy of Arts and Sciences
- 2022: Election to the National Academy of Sciences

=== Eponymy ===
The gastropod genus Vermeijius has been named in his honor.

== Bibliography ==
- Evolution and Escalation: An Ecological History of Life
- A Natural History of Shells
- Privileged Hands: A Scientific Life
- Nature: An Economic History
- The Evolutionary World: How Adaptation Explains Everything from Seashells to Civilization (ISBN 978-0312591083).
