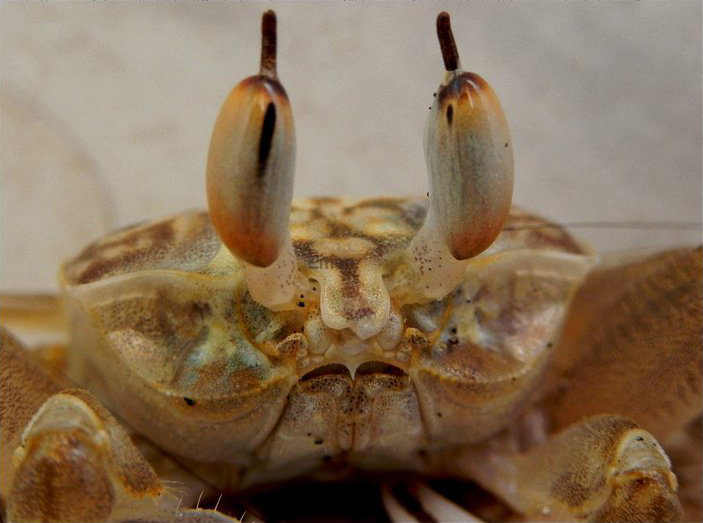
- Ocypode brevicornis from Chennai, India
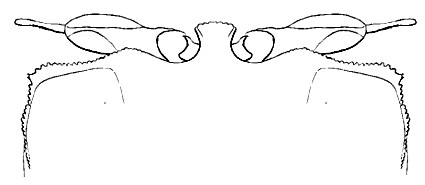
- An 1882 illustration of the eyestalks and the front of the carapace of Ocypode brevicornis by Edward J. Miers

Scientific classification
- Kingdom: Animalia
- Phylum: Arthropoda
- Clade: Pancrustacea
- Class: Malacostraca
- Order: Decapoda
- Suborder: Pleocyemata
- Infraorder: Brachyura
- Family: Ocypodidae
- Genus: Ocypode
- Species: O. brevicornis

Binomial name
- Ocypode brevicornis H. Milne-Edwards, 1837
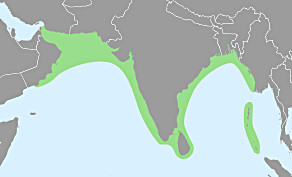
- Ocypode brevicornis distribution range (in green)

Synonyms
- Ocypode platytarsis H. Milne-Edwards, 1852; Ocypode neglecta Ortmann, 1894a

= Ocypode brevicornis =

Species of crab

Ocypode brevicornis is a species of ghost crab native to the Indian Ocean, from the Gulf of Oman to the Nicobar Islands. They are relatively large ghost crabs with a somewhat trapezoidal body. The carapace reaches a length of 41 mm (1.6 in) and a width of 50 mm (2.0 in). They are a mottled brown to yellow in coloration. Like other ghost crabs, one of their claws is much larger than the other. Their eyestalks are large and elongated, tipped with prolongations at the tip known as styles. They are common inhabitants of open sandy beaches, living in burrows in the intertidal zone.

== Taxonomy ==
Ocypode brevicornis was first described by the French zoologist Henri Milne-Edwards in 1837. However, his type specimens consisted only of two juvenile individuals from Pondicherry, India. In 1852, he again described the same species from adult specimens recovered from the same area as Ocypode platytarsis. In 1880, the American zoologist John Sterling Kingsley synonymized Ocypode brevicornis with Ocypode ceratophthalma. As a result, only Ocypode platytarsis was regarded as valid for the entirety of the 20th century. And most literature concerning the species refer to it as Ocypode platytarsis. In 2013, the Japanese carcinologist Katsushi Sakai and German carcinologist Michael Türkay discovered that the type specimens of Ocypode brevicornis and Ocypode platytarsis belonged to the same species. They restored the validity of the earlier name Ocypode brevicornis.

Ocypode brevicornis has also been frequently confused with Ocypode ceratophthalma, due to the fact that both species possess elongations of their eyestalks (styles). The variety Ocypode brevicornis var. longicornuta described by the American zoologist James Dwight Dana is now known to be a synonym of Ocypode ceratophthalma.

Ocypode brevicornis belongs to the genus Ocypode of the ghost crab subfamily Ocypodinae in the family Ocypodidae.

== Description ==
Ocypode brevicornis are large ghost crabs with deep bodies. The carapace in adults ranges from 24 to 41 mm (0.94 to 1.61 in) in length, and 26 to 50 mm (1.0 to 2.0 in) in width. It is almost trapezoidal in shape, with the rear end distinctly narrower than the front. It is wider than it is long and covered with scattered rough bumps (tubercles). The upper margins of the eye sockets slant forwards on the inner half and backwards for the outer half. The edges of the eye sockets are rectangular.

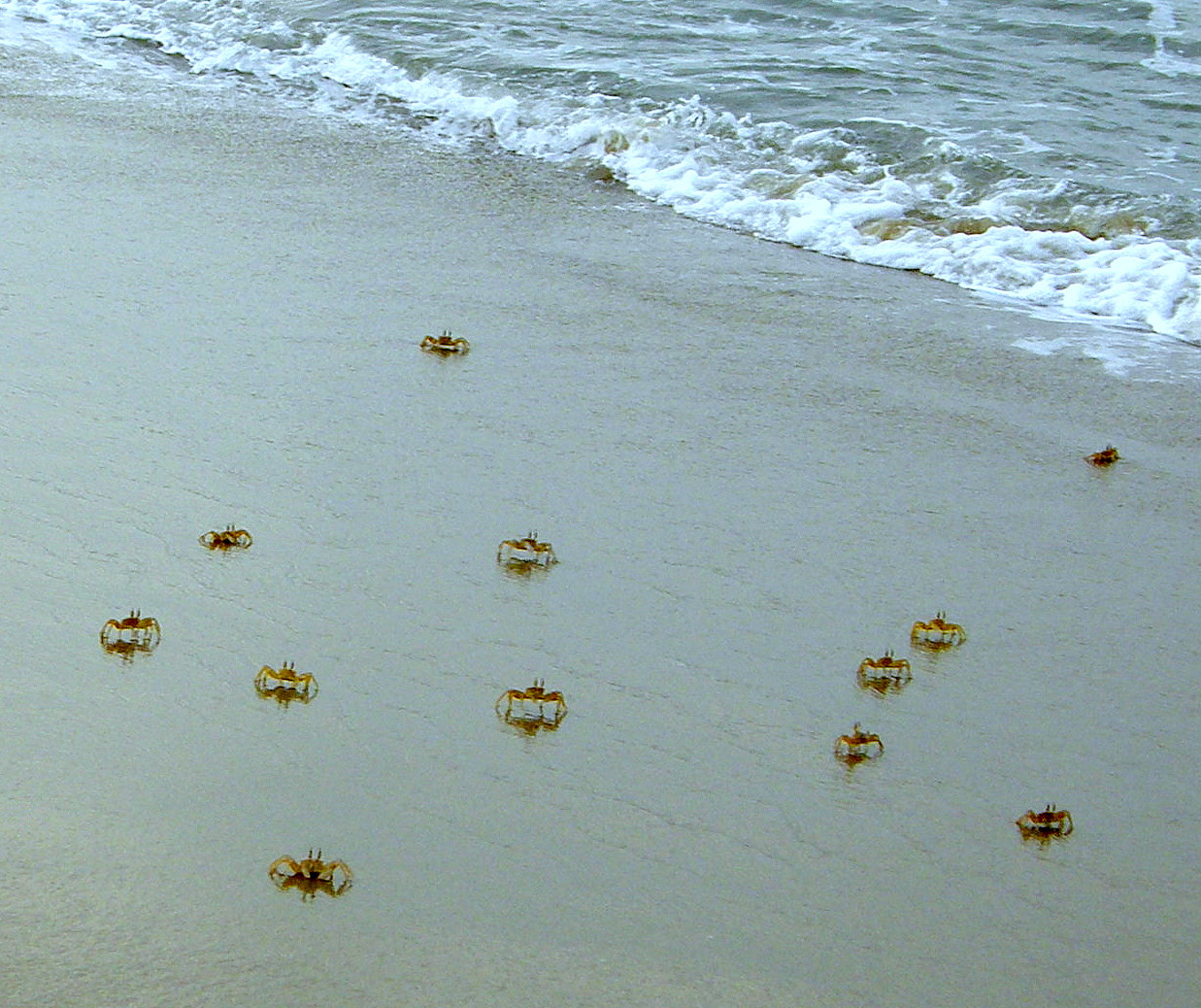
Ocypode brevicornis in Chennai, India

The eyestalks are large and swollen with the cornea occupying most of the bottom half. The eyestalks exhibit prolongations (styles) on the tips like some other members of the genus. The styles may be absent or much shorter in juvenile specimens, as it only starts growing when the crab is around 12 mm (0.47 in) in length.

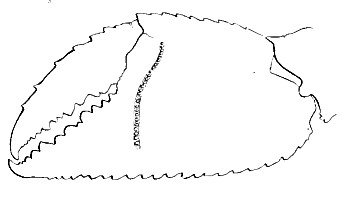
Stridulating ridge on the palm of the larger claw of Ocypode brevicornis

Like other ghost crabs, one of the claw appendages (chelipeds, the first pereiopod pair) of Ocypode brevicornis is much bigger than the other. The palm of the larger cheliped is long with a rough bumpy texture on the upper surface. The upper edges of the palm are covered with small bumps while the bottom edge is serrated. The inner surface of the palm of the larger claw in both sexes features stridulating (sound-producing) ridges, which is important for identifying different species within the subfamily Ocypodinae. In Ocypode brevicornis, the stridulating ridge is composed of a row of 23 to 28 tubercles. The smaller cheliped tapers towards a pointed end.

The first gonopod (appendages modified into sexual organs) of the male is stem-like. Its cross-section has three sides on the base ending in a slightly curving tip. A broad and flat palp is present. The covering (operculum) of the female genital opening is oriented lengthwise with a thick straight rim slanting backwards.

Adult Ocypode brevicornis are a mottled yellow to brown in coloration. Males have been observed to display brighter yellow colors, especially on their legs. Juveniles have almost perfect cryptic camouflage, making it very difficult to pick them out from their surroundings.

== Ecology ==
Like other ghost crabs, Ocypode brevicornis live in deep burrows near the intertidal zone of open sandy beaches. They are generalists, scavenging carrion and debris as well as preying on small animals.

They are primarily nocturnal, though they may emerge during the day. They are swift runners, darting away to their burrows at the slightest sign of danger, even when the intruder sighted is still 30 ft (9.1 m) away. However, they can be approached much more closely at night, though they may still try to escape if illuminated.

Males of Ocypode brevicornis exhibit elaborate territorial displays. Like other ghost crabs, they produce sound and vibration by rapping their larger claws against the ground. They may also display "dances" on the approach of another ghost crab. Beginning with a rearing posture, the males conduct increasingly complex sideways movements ending by running around the intruder in circles until it retreats.

== Distribution ==
Ocypode brevicornis are restricted to the Indian Ocean. They can be found from the Gulf of Oman to India, Sri Lanka, and the Nicobar Islands. They are one of six ghost crab species found in the Indian subcontinent, the others being Ocypode ceratophthalma, Ocypode cordimanus, Ocypode macrocera, Ocypode pallidula, and Ocypode rotundata.

== See also ==
- Heloecius - the semaphore crab
