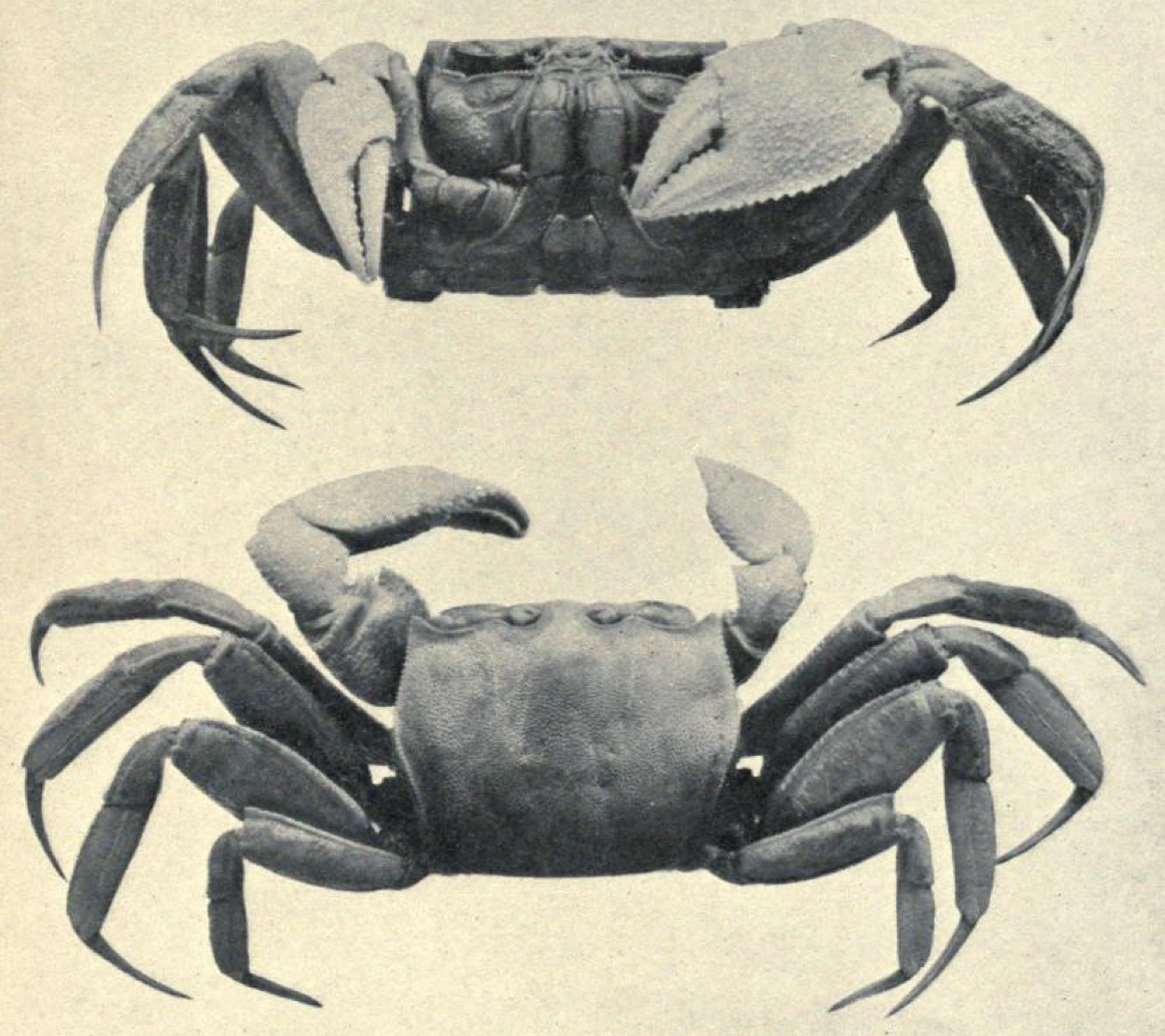
- Hoplocypode occidentalis male

Scientific classification
- Kingdom: Animalia
- Phylum: Arthropoda
- Clade: Pancrustacea
- Class: Malacostraca
- Order: Decapoda
- Suborder: Pleocyemata
- Infraorder: Brachyura
- Family: Ocypodidae
- Subfamily: Ocypodinae
- Genus: Hoplocypode; Sakai & Türkay, 2013
- Species: H. occidentalis

Binomial name
- Hoplocypode occidentalis (Stimpson, 1860)
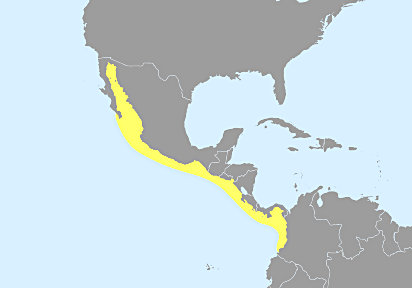
- Gulf ghost crab distribution range (in yellow)

Synonyms
- Ocypoda occidentalis Stimpson, 1860; Ocypode occidentalis Stimpson, 1860

= Gulf ghost crab =

Species of crab

The gulf ghost crab, Hoplocypode occidentalis, is a species of ghost crabs native to the Pacific coast of the Americas, from the Gulf of California to Colombia. It is the only species in the genus Hoplocypode. Gulf ghost crabs are medium-sized, reaching a maximum overall body diameter of 6 in (15 cm). They are one of only two ghost crab species found in the eastern Pacific (the other being the painted ghost crabs). However, gulf ghost crabs can easily be distinguished from painted ghost crabs by the absence of "horns" on their eyes.

== Taxonomy ==
Hoplocypode occidentalis was first described by the American marine biologist William Stimpson in 1860 as Ocypoda occidentalis. The type specimens were originally collected from Cabo San Lucas, Baja California, Mexico. It was transferred to its own genus Hoplocypode in 2013 by Katsushi Sakai and Michael Türkay based on the differences of their gonopods (appendages modified into copulatory organs) from that of the rest of the members of the genus Ocypode. It is classified under the ghost crab subfamily Ocypodinae in the family Ocypodidae.

The specific name is from Latin occidentalis ("western"). They are commonly known as the "gulf ghost crab" in English and cangrejo de playa in Spanish.

== Description ==
Gulf ghost crabs are medium-sized ghost crabs with deep bodies, reaching a maximum overall body diameter of 6 in (15 cm). The upper surface of the body is generally dark gray with lighter colored marbling. The underside of the body, the tips of the walking legs, and the claws are creamy white. Their coloration varies, usually matching the color of the sand surrounding them, but they are easier to see on black volcanic sand and on light-colored dry sand.

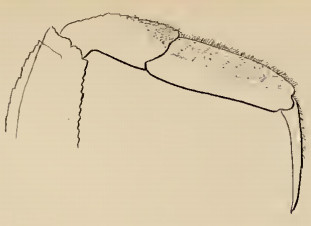
An 1882 illustration of a walking leg of a gulf ghost crab by Edward J. Miers: He incorrectly identified it as Ocypode kuhlii (which is only found in Southeast Asia).

The carapace is squarish in shape and wider than it is long, with a length around 43 mm (1.7 in) and a width of 50 mm (2.0 in). It is thickly covered with rough, small bumps (tubercles). Their eyestalks are large and elongated, but do not possess "horns" as in some other ghost crab species. The outer half of margins of the eye sockets curve distinctly inwards, with the outer edges (exorbital angles) triangular in shape with a sharp, forward-facing, pointed end.

Like other ghost crabs, one of the claw appendages (chelipeds, the first pereiopod pair) of gulf ghost crabs is much bigger than the other. The palm of the larger cheliped is elongated with a serrated lower edge and covered with tubercles on the upper surface. It features stridulating (sound-producing) ridges on the inner surface of the palm, which is important for identifying different species within the subfamily Ocypodinae. In gulf ghost crabs, the stridulating ridge is short and composed of a row of 21 to 22 tubercles. The smaller cheliped tapers towards a pointed end.

The second pair of walking legs are not more than two and a half times the length of the carapace. The fourth pair is relatively smaller and weaker in comparison to the other three pairs, reaching only to the middle of the propodus of the third pair. The mera and carpi of all the legs are naked, but the propodi possess fur-like bristles (setae) on for the first three walking leg pairs varying by sex. In males, the propodi of the first and second pair of walking legs have their upper forward surfaces covered with setae. The propodi of the third pair of walking legs only have setae on the upper margin of the propodi. In females, the propodi of the third and last pair of walking legs do not possess bristles on the upper surfaces of their propodi.

The first gonopods (modified copulatory organs) of males are also distinctively complex in shape, with a triangular cross-section at the base and becoming hoof-like towards the end. This characteristic is one of the diagnostic criteria for the genus. The covering (operculum) of the genital duct of the females has four sides and is membranous and slightly calcified. The genital slit is narrow and aligned along the middle of the operculum.

== Ecology ==
Gulf ghost crabs live in burrows near the intertidal zone of open sandy beaches and on sand and silt banks near where river mouths empty into the sea. Larger individuals usually have burrows further up the shore, while smaller individuals are closer to the waves. They are nocturnal, emerging from their burrows just after sunset. They are fast-moving generalist scavengers and predators, usually feeding on decaying bodies of fish and other crustaceans. They are also devastating predators of eggs and hatchlings of sea turtles, including the olive Ridley sea turtle (Lepidochelys olivacea) and the leatherback sea turtle (Dermochelys coriacea). In Playa Grande, Costa Rica, they've been observed to be responsible for as much as 48% of the total number of deaths in freshly hatched sea turtles crossing the beaches towards the water.

== Distribution ==
Gulf ghost crabs are native to the eastern Pacific coast of the Americas, from the Gulf of California to Colombia. They are sympatric with the painted ghost crab (Ocypode gaudichaudii), and juvenile specimens of the two smaller than 5 by 6 mm (0.20 by 0.24 in) are very difficult to tell apart. However, the adults are readily distinguishable, as painted ghost crabs are brightly colored and possess "horns" (styles) on their eyestalks which are absent in gulf ghost crabs. Painted ghost crabs also prefer sheltered rocky beaches, while gulf coast crabs are found on open sandy beaches.

Gulf ghost crabs also superficially resemble the Atlantic ghost crab (Ocypode quadrata), but the two species do not occur in the same areas, with the latter being only found in the western Atlantic coast of the Americas.

== See also ==
- Heloecius - the semaphore crab
