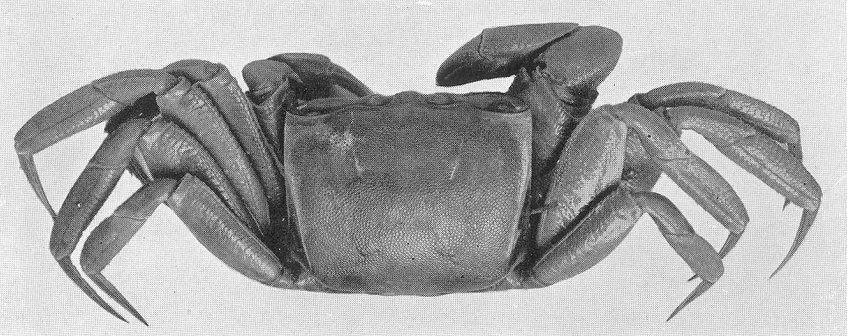

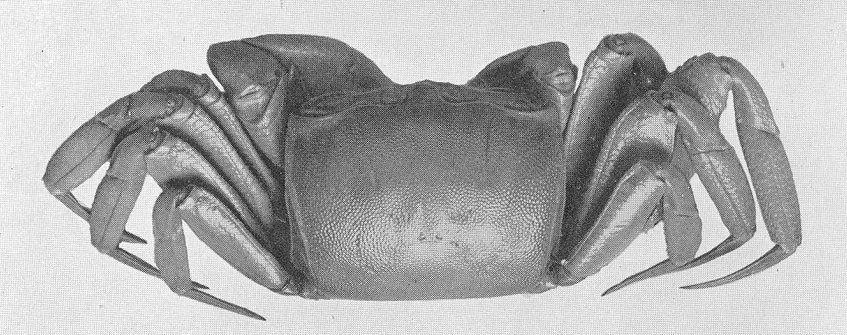
- African ghost crab male (top) and female (bottom) from the Congo River estuary. The carapace of the male is around 2.9 cm (1.1 in) in width.

Scientific classification
- Kingdom: Animalia
- Phylum: Arthropoda
- Clade: Pancrustacea
- Class: Malacostraca
- Order: Decapoda
- Suborder: Pleocyemata
- Infraorder: Brachyura
- Family: Ocypodidae
- Genus: Ocypode
- Species: O. africana

Binomial name
- Ocypode africana de Man, 1881
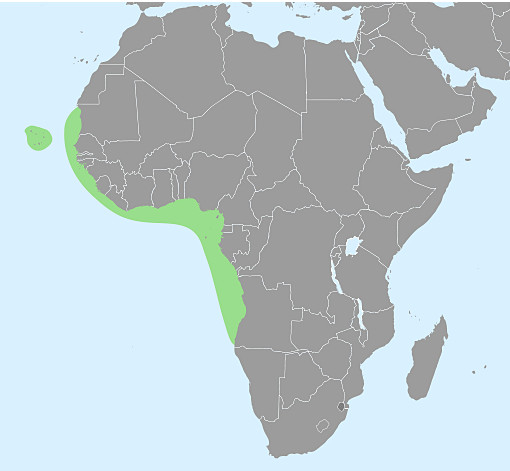
- African ghost crab distribution range (in green)

Synonyms
- Ocypode hexagonura Hilgendorf, 1882; Ocypode edwardsi Osório, 1890

= Ocypode africana =

African ghost crab

Species of crab

Ocypode africana, commonly known as the African ghost crab, is a species of ghost crabs native to the eastern Atlantic coast of western Africa, from Mauritania to Namibia. They are medium-sized ghost crabs reaching carapace width of 3.4 cm (1.3 in). They can vary in coloration from pinkish to dark grey. They are one of only two ghost crab species found in the eastern Atlantic (the other being the tufted ghost crabs). However, African ghost crabs can easily be distinguished from tufted ghost crabs by the absence of long tufts of hair on the tip of their eyestalks.

== Taxonomy ==
Ocypode africana was first described by the Dutch biologist Johannes Govertus de Man in 1881. It is classified under the genus Ocypode of the ghost crab subfamily Ocypodinae in the family Ocypodidae. The specific name is from Latin africana ("African").

They are commonly known as the "African ghost crab" in English, ocypode africain in French, and capuco africano in Spanish.

== Description ==
African ghost crabs are medium-sized ghost crabs with deep bodies, reaching a maximum carapace width of 3.4 cm (1.3 in). The rear part of the carapace is slightly narrower than the front, but it is more or less squarish in shape. The dorsal surface of the carapace is slightly convex. It is densely covered with small low bumps (tubercles), giving it a granular texture. The outer half of the upper edges of the eye socket curve distinctly inward, with the outer angles broadly triangular and directed forward. Their eyestalks are large and elongated, with the cornea occupying most of the bottom surface. But they do not possess the tuft of hair at the tip as in the tufted ghost crabs. Neither do they exhibit exophthalmy, the elongation (style) of the tip exhibited by some other members of the genus.

Like other ghost crabs, one of the claw appendages (chelipeds, the first pereiopod pair) of gulf ghost crabs is much bigger than the other. The palm of the larger cheliped is broad with a granular texture on the upper surface and finely serrated on the bottom edge. The inner surface of the palm features stridulating (sound-producing) ridges, which is important for identifying different species within the subfamily Ocypodinae. In gulf ghost crabs, the stridulating ridge is short and composed of a row of 11 to 13 tubercles, spaced more distantly and with striae (thin lines) on the upper half. The smaller cheliped tapers towards a pointed end. The dactyl (tipmost part) of the walking legs lack the dense hair characteristic of tufted ghost crabs.

The first gonopod (appendages modified into sexual organs) of the male is crooked sideways with a bulging tip. A thumb-like palp is present. The covering (operculum) of the female genital opening protrudes at the middle with strong rims on the sides.

== Ecology ==
Like other ghost crabs, they dig deep burrows on sandy beaches, almost always one individual per burrow. They can dig about five inches into the sand in 15 minutes. Their burrows usually have a supplementary tunnel leading upwards from the main tunnel. This is usually used as a temporary refuge when escaping from danger. This may also prevent the crab from drowning when high tide inundates the burrow.

They are generalist scavengers and predators of small animals, usually feeding on decaying plant debris and animal remains. They are primarily nocturnal, but they may emerge during the day. They are capable of morphological color change, being pinkish in hue during the morning hours, and a darker grey in the afternoon or during rainy days.

The behavior of African ghost crabs and tufted ghost crabs is distinct from that of other crabs found in the same region. African ghost crabs usually forage for food in the moist sand just above the breaking waves. At the slightest sign of danger (even when the intruder sighted is still more than 100 ft (30 m) away), they race in a zigzagging path back to their burrows to hide. As such they are very difficult to catch. However, they can usually be found about 2 ft (0.61 m) deep if their burrows are dug up. When captured, they may assume an inert pose but will revive and race away to find hiding places when the opportunity arises. When their burrows are destroyed, African ghost crabs may mill about confusedly, attempt to enter other burrows (though they are usually evicted immediately by the owner after a brief fight), or disappear into the sea.

== Distribution ==
African ghost crabs are native to the eastern Atlantic coast of western Africa, from Mauritania to Namibia. They are sympatric with the tufted ghost crab (Ocypode cursor), but are easily distinguishable, as they do not possess the tufts of hair on the tip of the eyestalks that characterize the latter. Their burrows are usually found in the same beaches as tufted ghost crabs. However, they commonly dig their burrows further up from the sea than tufted ghost crabs.

== Economic importance ==
African ghost crabs are edible, but are too small to be eaten in the usual way crabs are consumed. Like tufted ghost crabs, they can be cooked in a crab soup known as potage au tourlourou, but they are rarely caught for human consumption.

== Conservation ==
The number and density of ghost crab burrows are regarded as valuable ecological indicators for quickly assessing the impact of human disturbance on beach habitats. A 2011 study discovered that the density and number of African ghost crab burrows tend to be higher and with larger diameter burrows in moderately disturbed beaches in comparison to highly disturbed areas (characterized by the presence of seawalls, foot traffic, and inorganic pollutants).

== See also ==
- Heloecius - the semaphore crab
