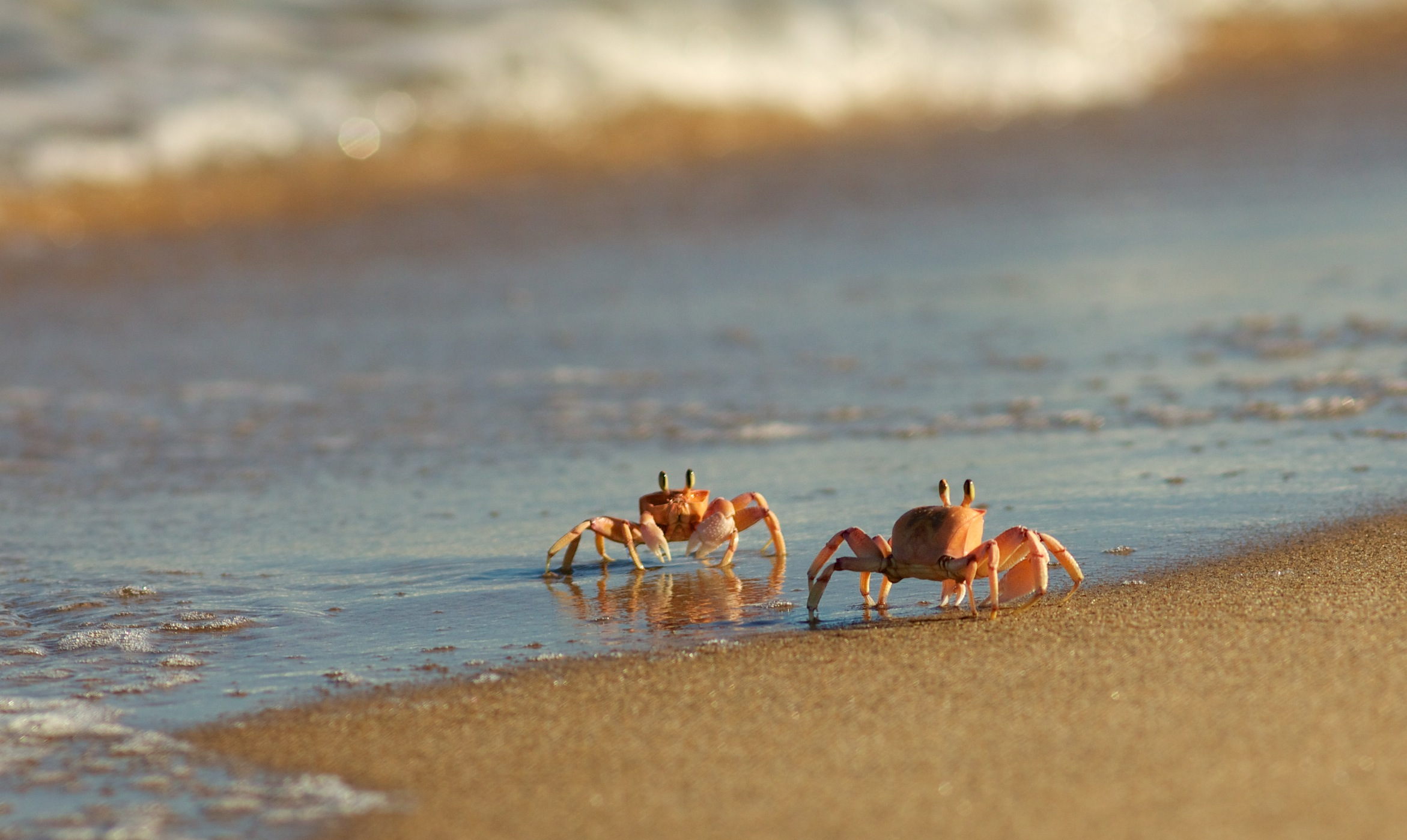

Scientific classification
- Kingdom: Animalia
- Phylum: Arthropoda
- Class: Malacostraca
- Order: Decapoda
- Suborder: Pleocyemata
- Infraorder: Brachyura
- Family: Ocypodidae
- Genus: Ocypode
- Species: O. ryderi

Binomial name
- Ocypode ryderi Kingsley, 1880

= Ocypode ryderi =

Species of crab

Ocypode ryderi, also known as the pink ghost crab, is a species of ghost crab found on the east coast of Africa from the Eastern Cape Region to Kenya.

== Identification ==
The body exhibits a pale pink hue with noticeable mauve/purple joints on the legs. It is characterized by a square carapace and long, sturdy legs. The eyes are on long stalks but lack the extended horns found in Ocypode ceratophthalma and some other Ocypode species. The larger of the two nippers has a granular stridulating organ on the palm which consists of a single row of granules. Adults are on average 35 millimetres (1.4 in) in length.

== Biology ==
They are abundant on tropical beaches that are exposed to the sea. They burrow deeply by day and emerge at night to feed on deposited carrion and small animals.

== Related Species ==
- Ocypode madagascariensis is almost identical but it is sandy coloured and its legs do not have mauve joints.
