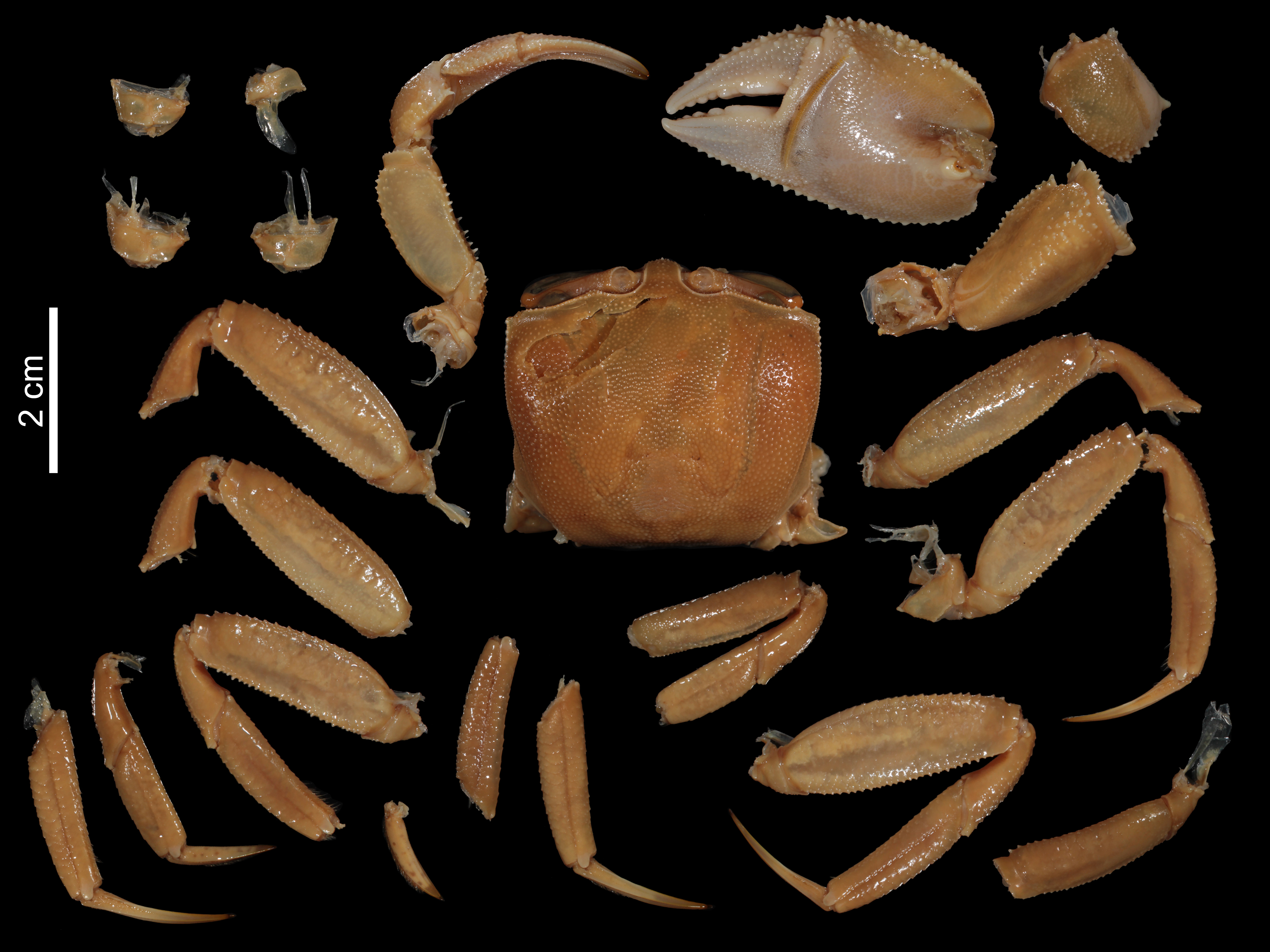
- Preserved specimen

Scientific classification
- Kingdom: Animalia
- Phylum: Arthropoda
- Class: Malacostraca
- Order: Decapoda
- Suborder: Pleocyemata
- Infraorder: Brachyura
- Family: Ocypodidae
- Genus: Ocypode
- Species: O. jousseaumei

Binomial name
- Ocypode jousseaumei (Nobili, 1905)

= Ocypode jousseaumei =

Species of crab

Ocypode jousseaumei is a small to medium-sized species of Ocypode found only in the Gulf of Aden and the Gulf of Oman. They are very similar to O. fabricii, but they are not found in the same localities.
