= Ocypode mortoni =

Scientific classification
- Kingdom: Animalia
- Phylum: Arthropoda
- Class: Malacostraca
- Order: Decapoda
- Suborder: Pleocyemata
- Infraorder: Brachyura
- Family: Ocypodidae
- Genus: Ocypode
- Species: O. mortoni

Binomial name
- Ocypode mortoni George, 1982

Species of crustacean

Ocypode mortoni is a small-sized species of Ocypode found in South China and southern Japan. It is closely related to O. stimpsoni which is also found in the same regions, but can be distinguished by the presence of styles on their eyestalks. They also share the same range with O. ceratophthalmus (which also possess styles), but O. mortoni have 35 to 71 striae on their stridulating ridges and their smaller claws have broadly rounded to flattened tips.
