= Ocypode nobilii =

Scientific classification
- Kingdom: Animalia
- Phylum: Arthropoda
- Class: Malacostraca
- Order: Decapoda
- Suborder: Pleocyemata
- Infraorder: Brachyura
- Family: Ocypodidae
- Genus: Ocypode
- Species: O. nobilii

Binomial name
- Ocypode nobilii De Man, 1902

Species of crustacean

Ocypode nobilii is a small-sized species of Ocypode found in the Gulf of Thailand, and the Malaysian Peninsula to northern Borneo. They are very similar to O. stimpsoni but they do not share the same distribution range.
