= Ocypode saratan =

Scientific classification
- Kingdom: Animalia
- Phylum: Arthropoda
- Class: Malacostraca
- Order: Decapoda
- Suborder: Pleocyemata
- Infraorder: Brachyura
- Family: Ocypodidae
- Genus: Ocypode
- Species: O. saratan

Binomial name
- Ocypode saratan (Forskål, 1775)

Species of crab

Ocypode saratan, also known as the Red Sea ghost crab, is a medium to large-sized species of Ocypode found in the Red Sea. Very common species in the Red Sea, and one of only two species known from there (O. cordimanus, or the smooth-handed ghost crab, has also been recorded in the Red Sea, but only rarely). Also known from Madagascar through Indian Ocean to the Western Pacific. Their eyestalks possess styles.
