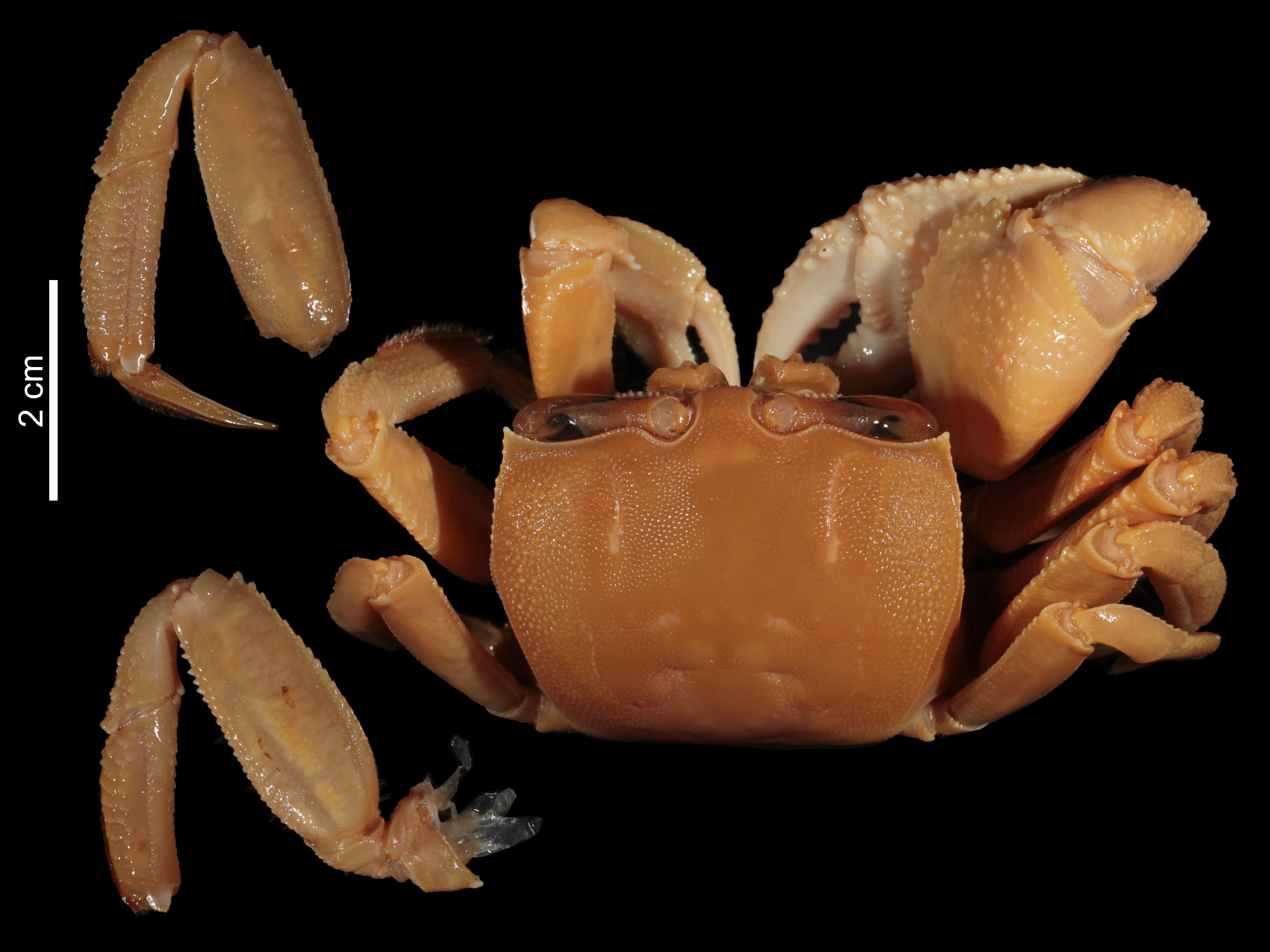
- Preserved specimen

Scientific classification
- Kingdom: Animalia
- Phylum: Arthropoda
- Class: Malacostraca
- Order: Decapoda
- Suborder: Pleocyemata
- Infraorder: Brachyura
- Family: Ocypodidae
- Genus: Ocypode
- Species: O. pauliani

Binomial name
- Ocypode pauliani Crosnier, 1965

= Ocypode pauliani =

Species of crab

Ocypode pauliani is a medium-sized species of Ocypode endemic to Madagascar. They possess 7 to 13 tubercles on their stridulating ridges. The smaller claw is pointed.
