= Getbol, Korean Tidal Flats =

World Heritage Site in South Korea

UNESCO World Heritage Site
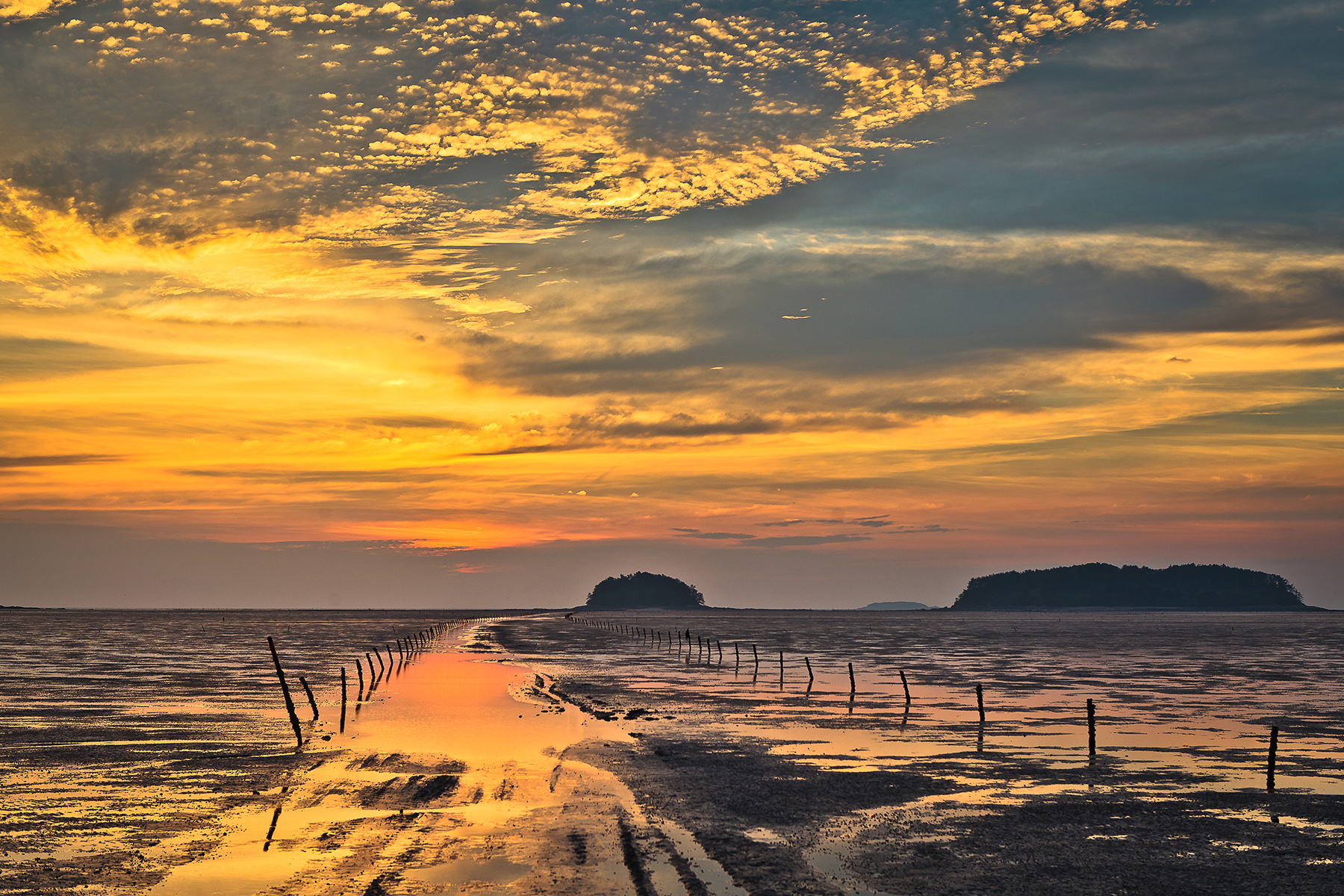
- Gochang Getbol
- Interactive map of Getbol, Korean Tidal Flats
- Location: North Jeolla, South Chungcheong, South Jeolla, South Korea
- Criteria: Natural: x
- Reference: 1591
- Inscription: 2021 (44th Session)
- Extensions: 2026 (48th Session)
- Area: 156,386 ha
- Buffer zone: 105,303 ha
- Getbol, Korean Tidal Flats (South Korea)

Getbol (Korean: 갯벌) are mudflats, or tidal flats, coastal sedimentary systems. They are important habitats for different types of organisms, including migrating birds and marine fauna such as clams, crabs, octopuses, and snails. In 2021, four getbol sites in South Korea were listed as a UNESCO World Heritage Site due to their outstanding natural properties, with an extension in 2026 resulting in the listing of six sites in total. Each of these sites represent a different type of getbol (estuarine type, open embayed type, archipelago type, and semi-enclosed type).

== Description ==
The four getbol sites that are listed are the Seocheon Getbol, Gochang Getbol, Shinan Getbol and Boseong-Suncheon Getbol. Three sites are located on Korea's western coast while the Boseong-Suncheon Getbol is located on the southern coast. They were listed under criterion (x), which covers sites that "contain the most important and significant natural habitats for in-situ conservation of biological diversity, including those containing threatened species of outstanding universal value from the point of view of science or conservation." Some of the species present in getbols include the mud octopus, Japanese mud crabs, fiddler crab, bristle worms, Stimpson's ghost crab, and Yellow Sea sand snail. There are also several species of suspension feeders, such as clams. Getbols support endangered species of migratory birds on their route across the Yellow Sea, as stopover sites on the East Asian–Australasian Flyway. There were 22 IUCN Red List species recorded as visitors, including the critically endangered spoon-billed sandpiper. Furthermore, 375 species of benthic diatoms, 118 waterbirds, 857 macrobenthos, 152 marine macroalgae, 47 endemic and 5 endangered marine invertebrate species have been recorded in the protected areas.

The tidal flats developed after the Last Glacial Maximum, in an interplay of rivers depositing the sediments and their dispersal by tidal currents, wave action, and wind-induced currents. They formed especially in the estuaries of large rivers and in the island coasts. As a result of monsoon climate, erosion and chemical weathering in the coast is taking place in winter while the deposition of sediment is taking place in summer.

Following the 2026 extension, the World Heritage property comprises six component areas. UNESCO reports that the tidal flats support 216 bird species, including 24 globally threatened species, and 53 species endemic to the Yellow Sea.

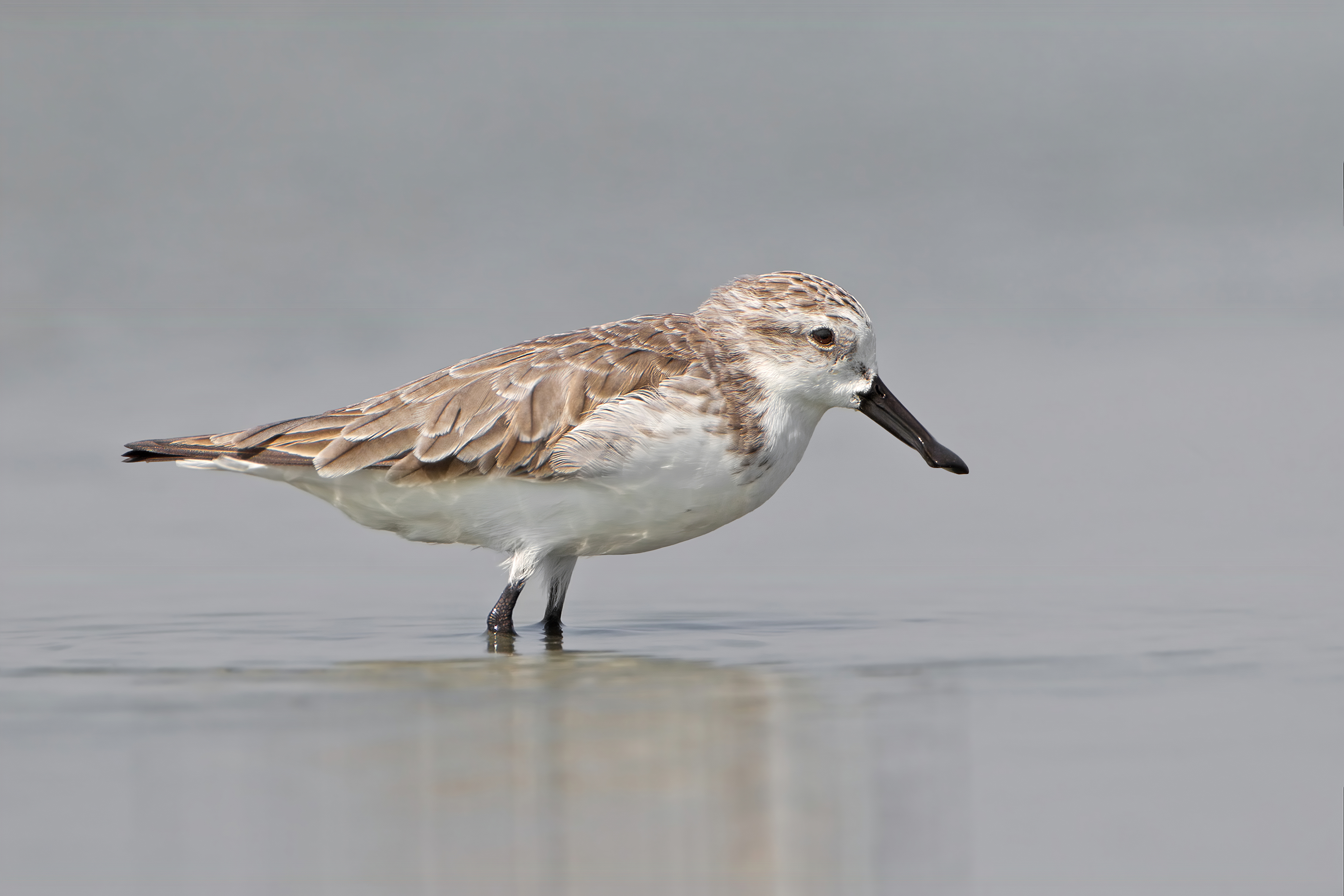
Spoon-billed sandpiper, a critically endangered bird species that visits the getbol during the migration

== Threats ==
All four sites are strictly managed as Wetland Protected Area (WPA) under the Wetlands Conservation Act. Still, there are some risks that are posed to the environment by activities such as dredging of port and sea lanes, construction of land-to-island and island-to-island bridges, development of offshore wind-power generation, mining of marine aggregates, introduction of harmful or marine ecosystem disturbing species, and fishing activities of locals. The most detrimental activity is land reclamation, but such actions are strictly banned in the World Heritage Sites. Possible environmental pressures include marine and coastal pollution, climate change, coastal erosion, and oil spills.
