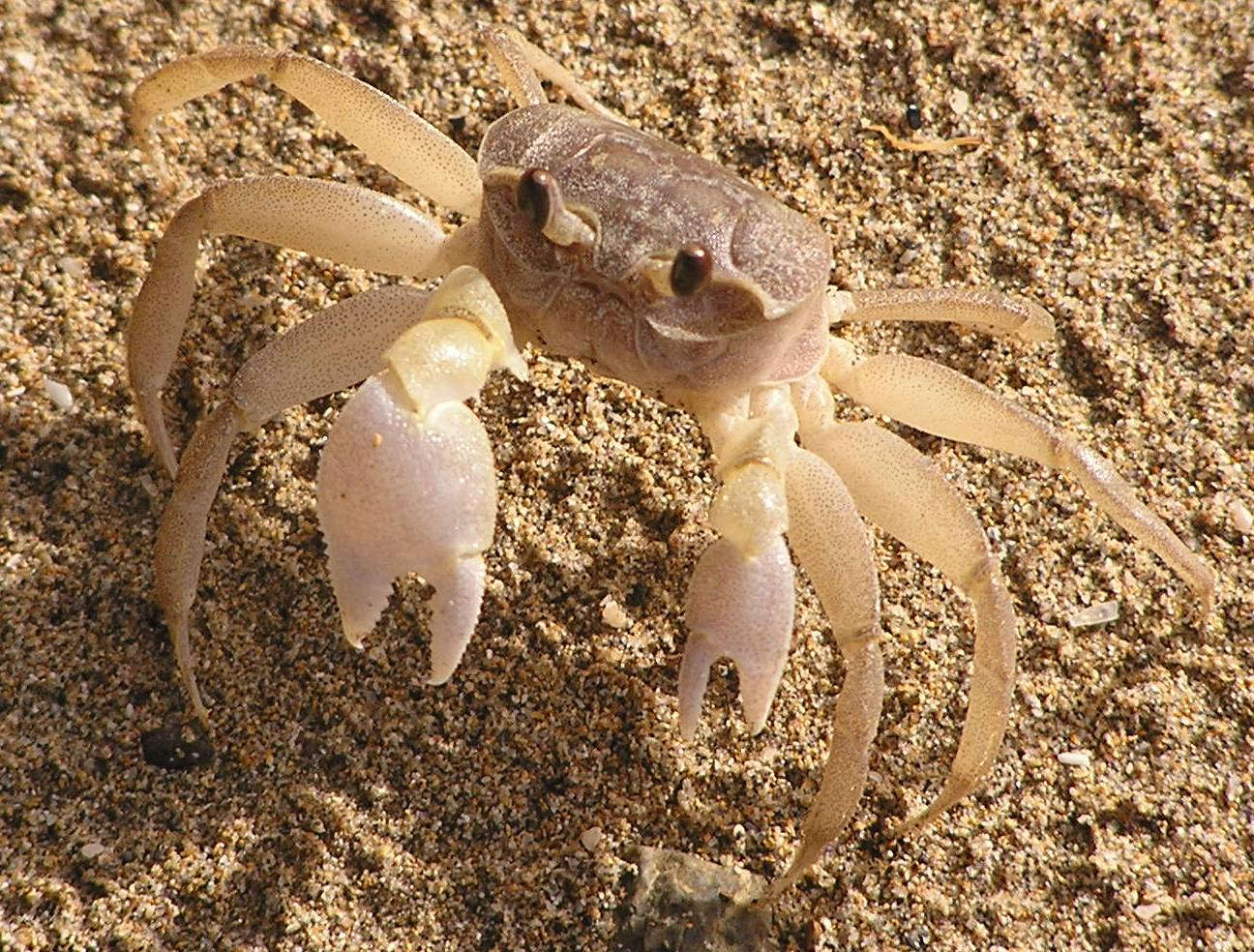
- Ocypode cordimana

Scientific classification
- Kingdom: Animalia
- Phylum: Arthropoda
- Class: Malacostraca
- Order: Decapoda
- Suborder: Pleocyemata
- Infraorder: Brachyura
- Subsection: Thoracotremata
- Superfamily: Ocypodoidea; Rafinesque, 1815

= Ocypodoidea =

Superfamily of crabs

The Ocypodoidea, or ocypoid crabs, are a superfamily of crabs, named after the genus Ocypode. It contains the following families:

- Camptandriidae Stimpson, 1858
- Dotillidae Stimpson, 1858
- Heloeciidae H. Milne-Edwards, 1852
- Macrophthalmidae Dana, 1851
- Mictyridae Dana, 1851
- Ocypodidae Rafinesque, 1815
- Xenophthalmidae Stimpson, 1858
