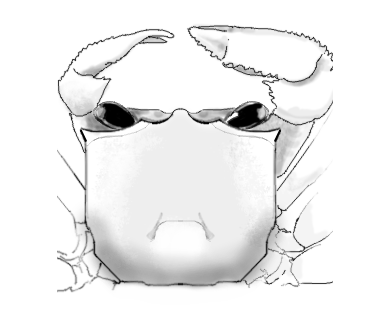
- Ocypode fabricii dorsal aspect (legs excluded)

Scientific classification
- Kingdom: Animalia
- Phylum: Arthropoda
- Clade: Pancrustacea
- Class: Malacostraca
- Order: Decapoda
- Suborder: Pleocyemata
- Infraorder: Brachyura
- Family: Ocypodidae
- Genus: Ocypode
- Species: O. fabricii

Binomial name
- Ocypode fabricii H. Milne-Edwards, 1837
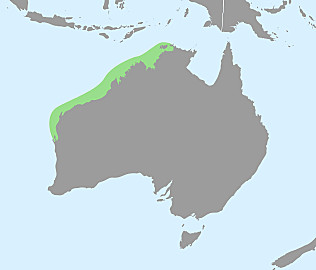
- Ocypode fabricii distribution range (in green)

= Ocypode fabricii =

Species of crab

Ocypode fabricii is a species of ghost crabs endemic to the coast of northern and western Australia, from Darwin to Shark Bay. They are medium-sized ghost crabs with a squarish body. The carapace reaches a length of 38 mm (1.5 in) and a width of 40 mm (1.6 in). Like other ghost crabs, one of their claws is much larger than the other. They live in burrows in the intertidal zones of the muddy to sandy beaches of mangrove forests.

== See also ==
- Golden ghost crab
