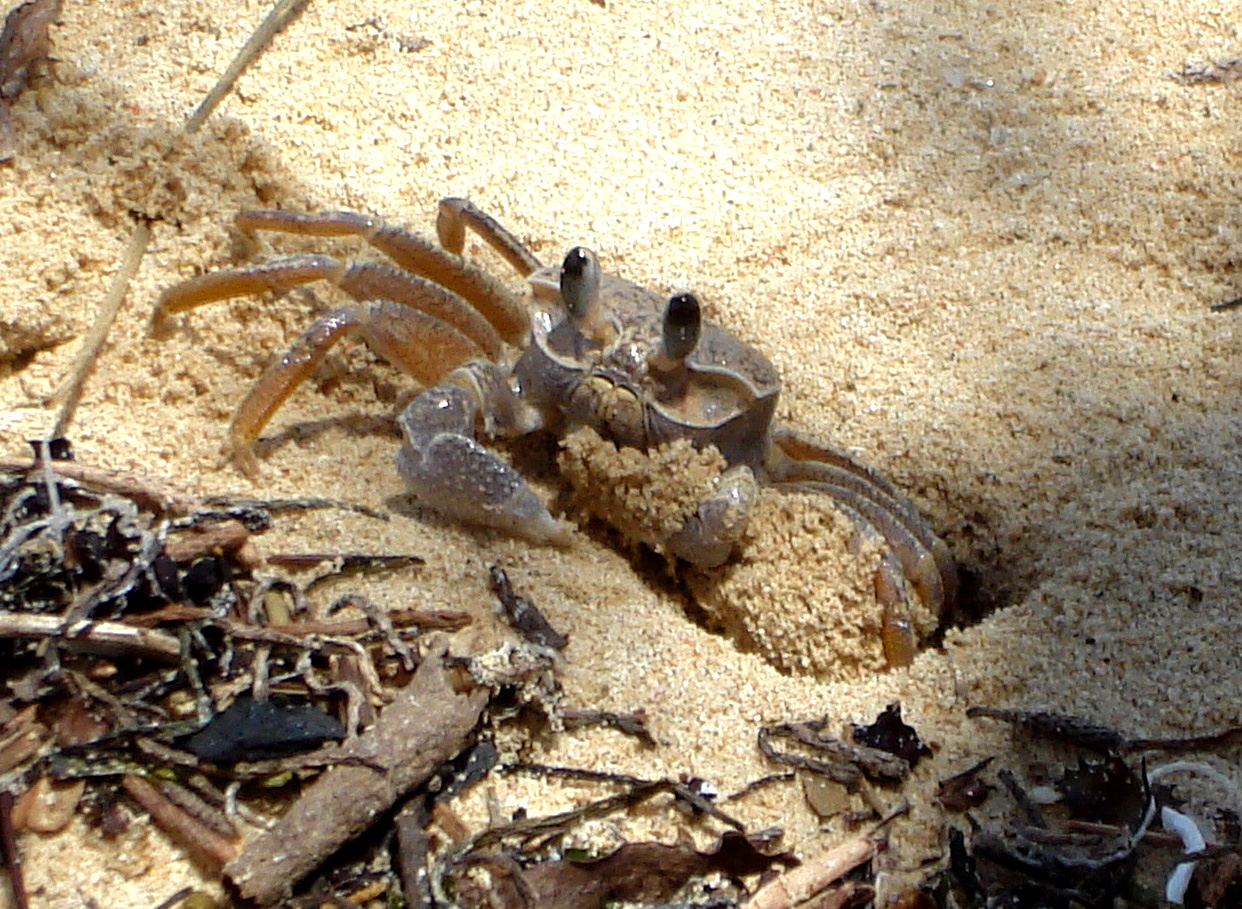

Scientific classification
- Kingdom: Animalia
- Phylum: Arthropoda
- Class: Malacostraca
- Order: Decapoda
- Suborder: Pleocyemata
- Infraorder: Brachyura
- Family: Ocypodidae
- Genus: Ocypode
- Species: O. madagascariensis

Binomial name
- Ocypode madagascariensis Crosnier, 1965

= Ocypode madagascariensis =

Species of crustacean

Ocypode madagascariensis is a medium-sized species of Ocypode found in Madagascar and the southeastern coast of Africa (from Mozambique to KwaZulu-Natal, South Africa). Its carapace is covered densely with rough tubercles on the upper surface and wider than it is long. The outer edges of the eye orbits are broadly triangular and project forward. Their stridulating ridge has 20 to 30 tubercles.
