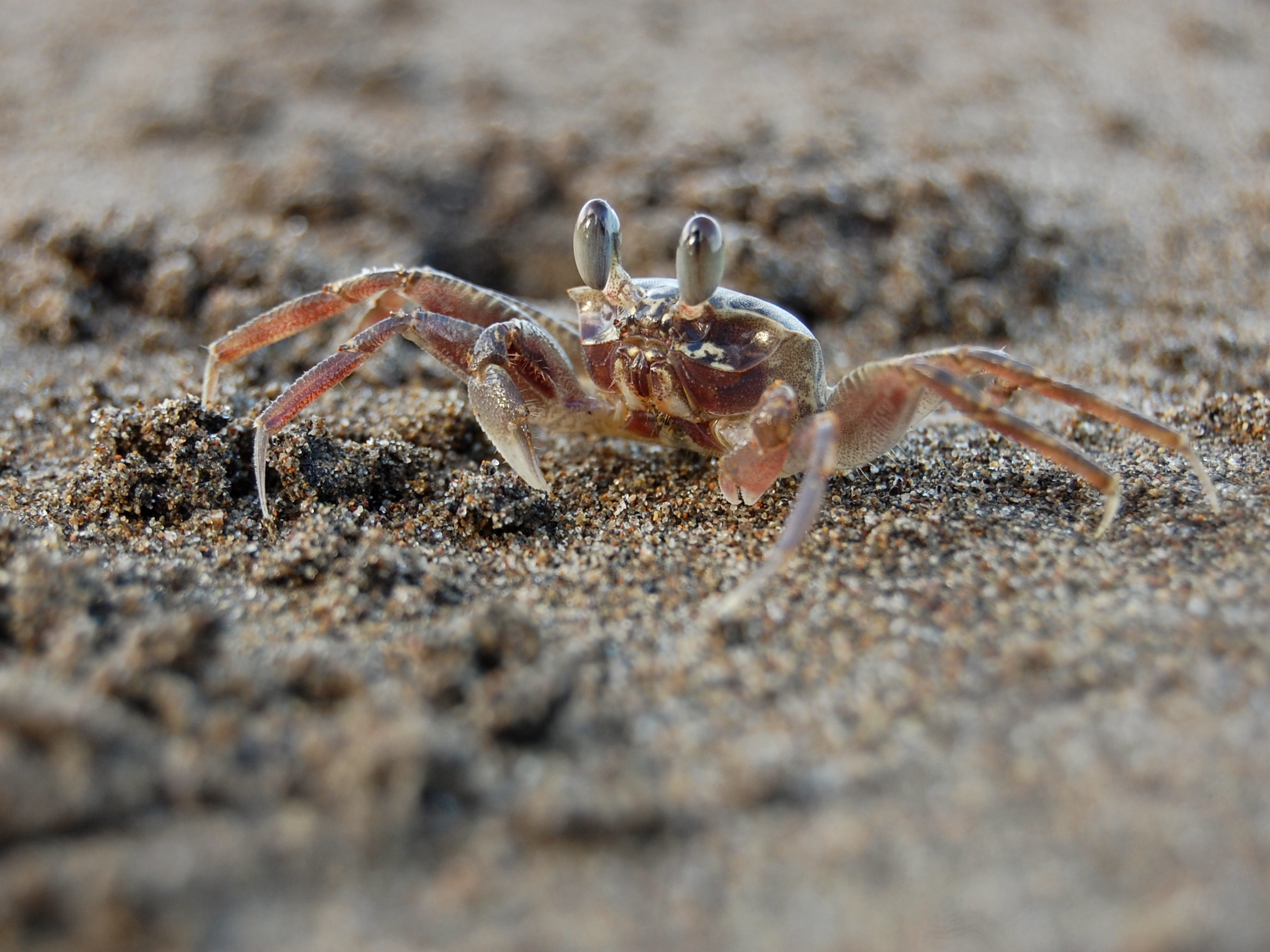
- In Palabuhanratu, West Java, Indonesia.

Scientific classification
- Kingdom: Animalia
- Phylum: Arthropoda
- Class: Malacostraca
- Order: Decapoda
- Suborder: Pleocyemata
- Infraorder: Brachyura
- Family: Ocypodidae
- Genus: Ocypode
- Species: O. kuhlii

Binomial name
- Ocypode kuhlii De Haan, 1835

= Ocypode kuhlii =

Species of crab

Ocypode kuhlii, the Kuhl's ghost crab, is a species of crab from the Ocypode genus. It is a mid to large-sized species of Ocypodidae. The species was described in 1835 by De Haan. This crab is observed very rarely on Christmas Island. It looks similar to the smooth-handed ghost crab.
