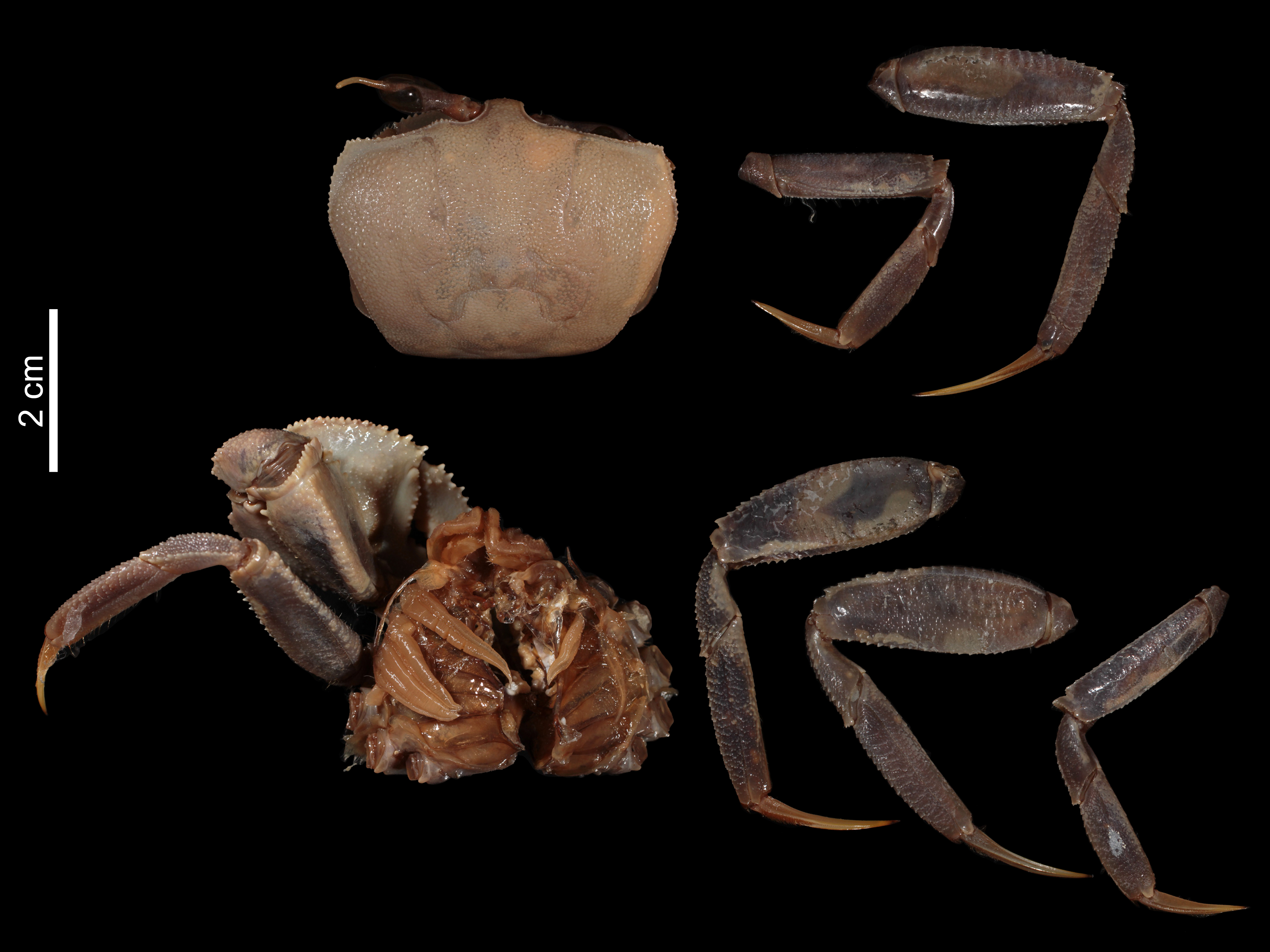
- Preserved specimen

Scientific classification
- Kingdom: Animalia
- Phylum: Arthropoda
- Class: Malacostraca
- Order: Decapoda
- Suborder: Pleocyemata
- Infraorder: Brachyura
- Family: Ocypodidae
- Genus: Ocypode
- Species: O. rotundata

Binomial name
- Ocypode rotundata Miers, 1882

= Ocypode rotundata =

Species of crab

Ocypode rotundata, also known as the rounded ghost crab, is a large-sized species of Ocypode found in the southern coast of the Arabian Peninsula to northern India (from Oman to Bombay), including the Persian Gulf. They are very similar to O. saratan but can be distinguished by having 10 to 15 irregularly spaced elongated tubercles with striae on their stridulating ridges and a thumb-like palp on their gonopods. Their eyestalks possess styles.
