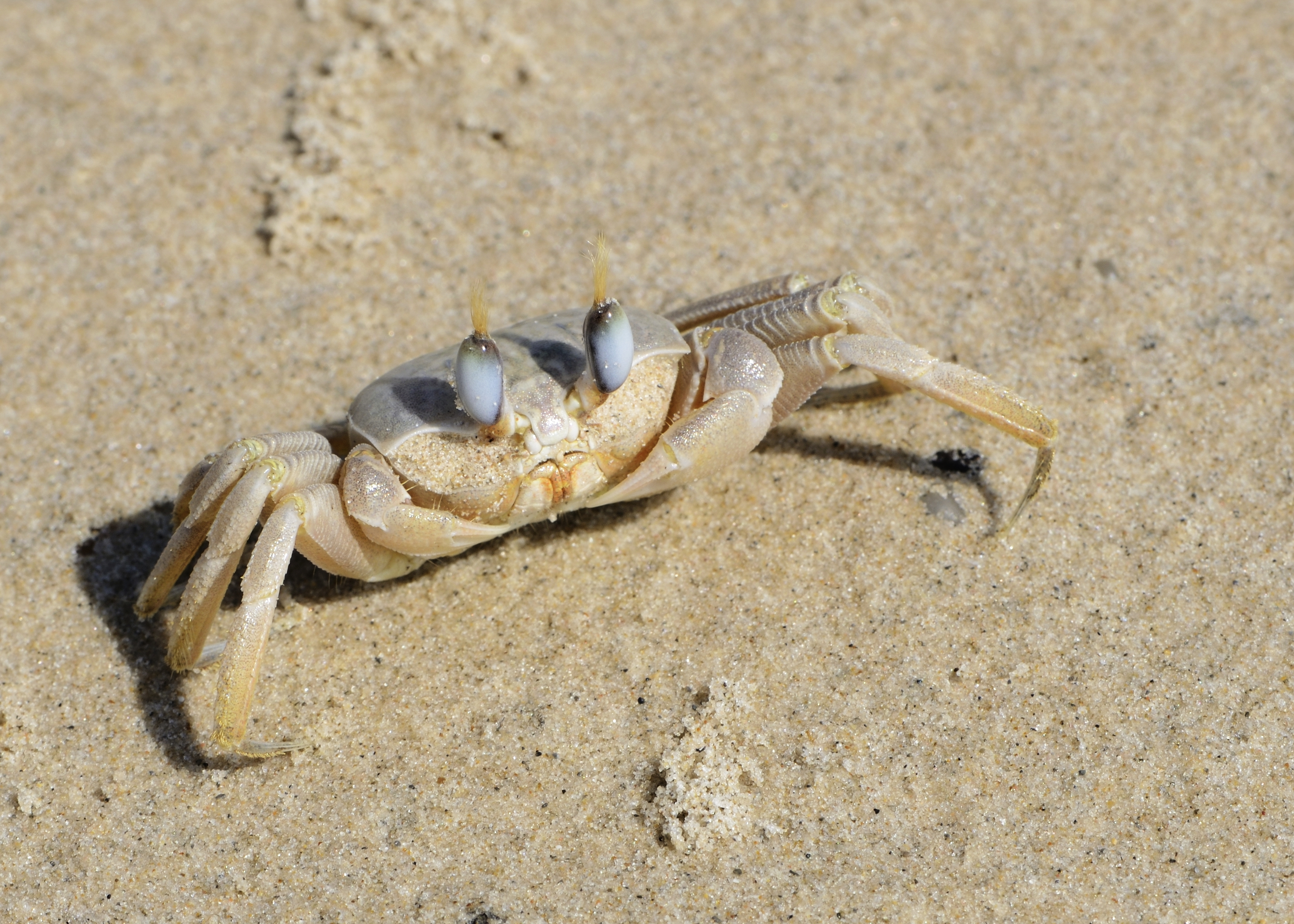

Scientific classification
- Kingdom: Animalia
- Phylum: Arthropoda
- Class: Malacostraca
- Order: Decapoda
- Suborder: Pleocyemata
- Infraorder: Brachyura
- Family: Ocypodidae
- Subfamily: Ocypodinae
- Genus: Ocypode
- Species: O. cursor

Binomial name
- Ocypode cursor (Linnaeus, 1758)

Synonyms
- Cancer cursor Linnaeus, 1758; Ocypode ippeus Olivier, 1804

= Ocypode cursor =

Species of crab

Ocypode cursor, the tufted ghost crab, is a species of ghost crab found on sandy beaches along the coasts of the eastern Atlantic Ocean and eastern Mediterranean Sea.

== Description ==
Ocypode cursor can reach a carapace width of 55 millimetres (2.2 in). O. cursor can be distinguished from O. ceratophthalma and other species of Ocypode by the presence of a tuft of setae (bristles) extending from the tips of the eyestalks.

== Distribution ==
Ocypode cursor has a disjunct distribution, comprising the eastern Mediterranean Sea and tropical parts of the eastern Atlantic Ocean, but not the western Mediterranean Sea which connects them. It is thought that O. cursor entered the Mediterranean Sea during a warm period, but was restricted to the warmer eastern part during a subsequent cooler period, isolating the two populations. Similar patterns are seen in the sea snail Charonia variegata and the sea anemone Telmatactis cricoides. Its range is apparently expanding in the Mediterranean, and it is likely that the two populations may rejoin in the future. In the Atlantic Ocean, O. cursor reaches as far south as northern Namibia, but does not reach South Africa.

== Ecology ==
In West Africa, and the eastern Mediterranean, Ocypode cursor prefers to live in sandy beaches, where it burrows near the high-tide mark, and sometimes above the intertidal zone altogether. The water content of the sand was the key factor determining burrow distribution. It is less tolerant of extremes of salinity and temperature than the fiddler crab Uca tangeri, but can still extend some distance into brackish waters. O. cursor is a predator, and frequently feeds on the eggs of sea turtles. In the Mediterranean Sea, where the tidal range is negligible, the burrows of O. cursor begin within 3 metres (10 ft) of the sea, with larger crabs further from the water's edge.

== Taxonomy ==
Ocypode cursor was first described by Carl Linnaeus in his 1758 10th edition of Systema Naturae, under the name "Cancer cursor".
