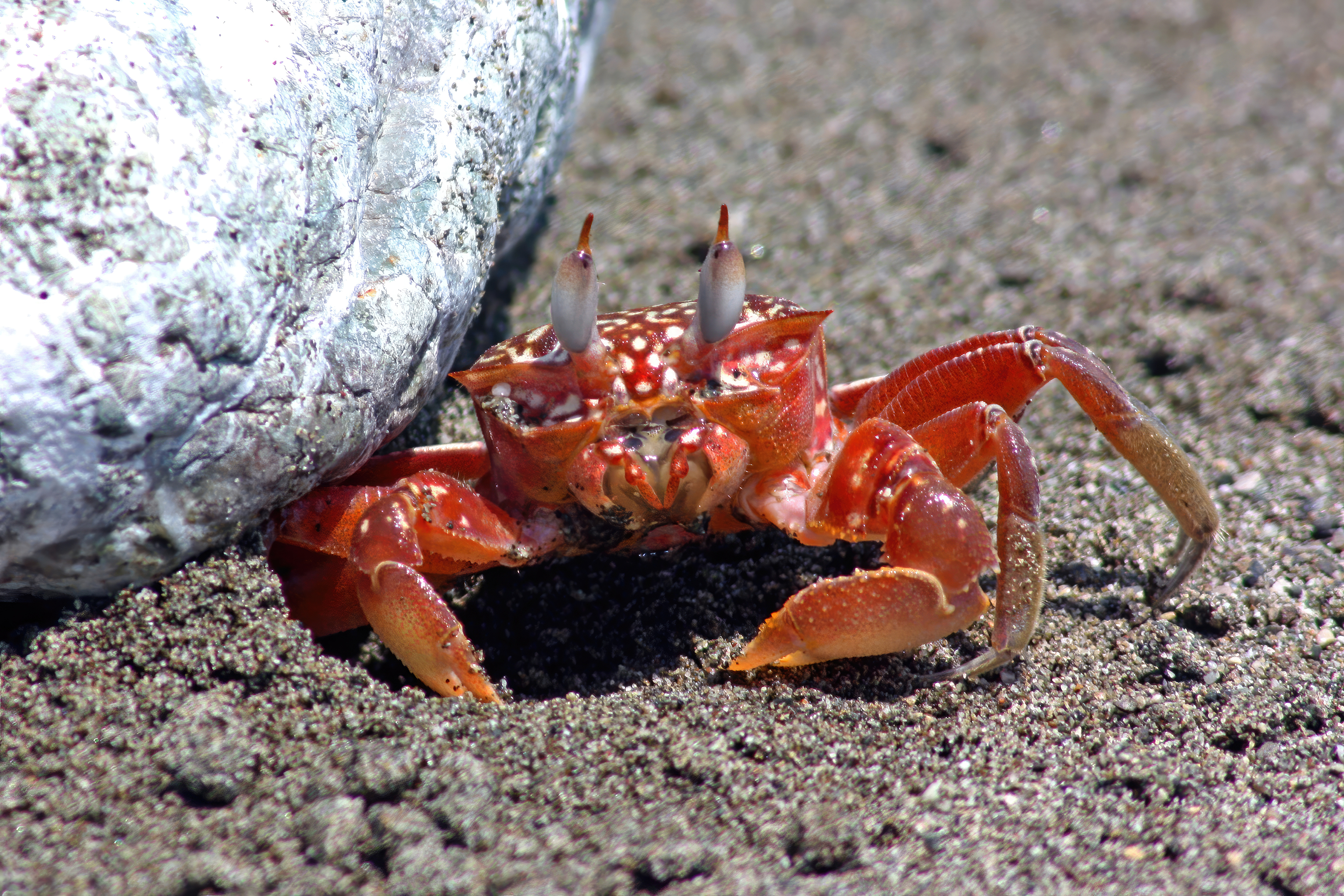

Scientific classification
- Kingdom: Animalia
- Phylum: Arthropoda
- Clade: Pancrustacea
- Class: Malacostraca
- Order: Decapoda
- Suborder: Pleocyemata
- Infraorder: Brachyura
- Family: Ocypodidae
- Genus: Ocypode
- Species: O. gaudichaudii

Binomial name
- Ocypode gaudichaudii H. Milne-Edwards & H. Lucas, 1843

= Ocypode gaudichaudii =

Species of crab

Ocypode gaudichaudii, also known as the painted ghost crab or cart driver crab, is a species of crab found on Pacific beaches from El Salvador to Chile as well as on the Galápagos Islands. The species was first described by Henri Milne-Edwards and Hippolyte Lucas in 1843.

They are diurnal crustaceans that display a red-orange color with sandy dots across the back of the carapace.

They are described with three distinct feeding behaviors that vary based on food source and development: as deposit feeders, scavengers, and predators. In all methods of feeding, visual clues and chemosensory are used to locate potential food. Their diet includes organic matter within sand, live organisms, and dead matter from both ocean and terrestrial sources.

In Peru, this crab is the host of the acanthocephalan parasite Neoandracantha peruensis.

== Taxonomy ==
Ocypode gaudichaudii was first described in 1843 by Henri Milne-Edwards and Hippolyte Lucas as they voyaged along the coasts of South America. Ocypode ghost crabs are the most abundant semi-terrestrial crab in the brachyuran suborder on sand beaches.

Misidentification of Ocypode crabs in experiments and field studies has been a prevalent issue. In particular, O. gaudichaudii and H. occidentalis have been commonly misidentified due to unreliable methods of identifying juveniles.

== Description ==
Painted ghost crabs have been described as opportunistic feeders in three different behaviors: as deposit feeders, scavengers, and predators. Typical food includes organic matter within sand, live organisms, and dead matter from both ocean and terrestrial sources. When adults, painted ghost crabs typically become specialized in deposit feeding and sift through the sand to find organic material as food. They develop specialized claws (or chelae), called truncated claws, which are used to forage in the sand as a makeshift shovel. The presence of truncated claws has been shown to allow a broader diet as the crabs are able to feed on both animals and diatoms. While the major chela of the painted ghost crab is typically the left, the major chela of another crab within the same genus, O. quadrata, has a 1:1 ratio between right and left cheliped laterality. Although further investigation is still required to fully understand the laterality of brachyuran crabs, there is strong evidence that the cheliped laterality among the genus Ocypode is bimodal.

In land crabs, including ghost crabs, the gill chambers play a vital part in respiration as air is drawn into the chambers via inspiratory openings. Oxygen is diffused across the gills within the chambers, ultimately entering the crab’s open circulatory system. Studies of aromatic respiration in land crabs have been conducted in the past, with the 5 species studied displaying a slow respiration response to exercise. However, it was found that the respiration and oxygen uptake response to exercise in O. gaudichaudii is more similar to that of mammals with high aerobic responses than what was previously found in other species of land crabs. The high aerobic respiration provides strong contradictions to the common theory that crustacean oxygen transport systems are inefficient. It also suggests that the main energy source for continuous mobility in ghost crabs such as O. gaudichaudii is aerobic ATP, much like mammals and other animals that use aerobic ATP in a similar manner.

Ocypode crabs are known to use acoustic signals as reproductive behavior, specifically air-borne sounds and vibrations of surrounding substrates through rapping or stridulating. Nocturnal vibrational signals from male Ocypode crabs are an important factor in courtship and reproductive behaviors.

== Ecology and behavior ==
Adult painted ghost crabs deposit feed on microscopic organic matter found in the sand, reaching their food by digging or foraging through the sand. Juveniles exhibit predatory feeding and commonly prey on small arthropods. All crabs of the Ocypode genus use their mandibles to break food into smaller pieces to aid in ingestion. When adults, painted ghost crabs become specialized in deposit feeding and sift through the sand to find organic material as food. After ingesting the organic matter, the non-digestible particles are formed into pellets that are then excreted from the buccal cavity.

The size of their carapace and presence of truncated claws has been shown to influence their diet. Individual O. gaudichaudii with carapaces larger than 12.3mm and exhibiting truncated claws prey upon either animals, diatoms, or a mix of both. Those smaller than such and with no truncated claws were found to have eaten solely animals.

Both visual cues along with chemosensory are important for locating prey within the sand substrates. Chemoreceptors along painted ghost crab’s walking legs and chelipeds (legs with pincer-like organs) may play a vital part in locating prey within the substrate with precision over short distances.

The movement of the tide influences behavior and activity patterns of male and female painted ghost crabs. When the tide recedes and the burrows are safe from oncoming water, both male and female crabs travel to the water line in droves. However, some do not travel to the water line as males remain to forage/ defend the burrows and females remain to select potential mates or to prepare their burrows for eggs. As high tide returns, the crabs that traveled to the water line return to the high intertidal zone and either excavate burrows or improve on existing burrows.

== Distribution ==
Both male and female painted ghost crabs dig burrows. The burrows act as important protection for the painted ghost crab, allowing them to avoid predators, rapid environmental changes, and other territorial crabs of the same species. The creation of the burrows includes characteristic behaviors and utilize both wet and dry sediment. O. gaudichaudii have been observed disposing of unwanted or unused sediments when building burrows with a kick, dump, or tamp behavior. Sand dug from the burrows are deposited by kicking or dumping while the deposited sand is manipulated by tamping. Tamping involves applying pressure to the sand using the ambulatory legs and all residents of tamped burrows are males. The majority of females are found in dumped burrows, but some can be found inhabiting kicked burrows. The varying sand disposal behaviors create differing burrow patterns and characteristics. Tamped sand is the most abundant surrounding painted crab burrows, and individuals within tamped burrows are larger than kicked and dumped.

Furthermore, the environmental conditions and tidal patterns greatly influence the morphology and distribution of burrows. The abundance and amount of tamped burrows varies with the tidal and lunar cycle, as the majority of burrows during a full moon are tamped. It is possible tamped burrows act as a visual courtship behavior, providing females a guide to potential mates and assisting with the creation/reach of acoustic courtship signals.

While there is a small percentage within populations in which more than one crab inhabits a burrow, the majority are inhabited by one crab, suggesting a territorial behavior in relation to burrows. The burrowing of O. gaudichaudii along sandy beaches creates fringe areas in which the abundance of burrows and proximity to one another changes between fringes. Waves and swash climates are one of the main restrictors to the locations of permanent burrows, as the majority are found above the drift line. Other factors that influence the distribution of burrows include drift line height/width and the slope of dry and retention zones along the sand.

== Conservation ==
Ghost crabs within the genus Ocypode can be used as bioindicators to the effects of human presence and alterations on coastal environments. This is because they are apex predators in their environment, are present at unvegetated beaches and dunes, and their changes in population and density are easy to calculate by counting the number of burrow holes present and measuring the size of the openings. Human interaction on beaches occupied by painted ghost crabs significantly impacts the habitat's population density. Specifically, mechanical cleaning methods (commonly involving the filtering of sand using motorized vehicles) significantly decrease the density of ghost crabs. One main factor to the decreased density by mechanical cleaning methods is trampling; burrows do not provide adequate protection against the weight of 4-wheel drive vehicles and the ghost crabs are ultimately crushed under the sand. The presence of dunes is also important to the distribution of ghost crabs as beaches where the majority of sand dunes have been replaced with infrastructure contain only remnant communities of ghost crabs. It is important to consider the impacts of human activity and development on the population density and structure of ghost crabs as they play a critical role in intertidal communities. Mechanical cleaning, building of infrastructure, and amount of human activity all affect the population of ghost crabs within intertidal environments

== Gallery ==
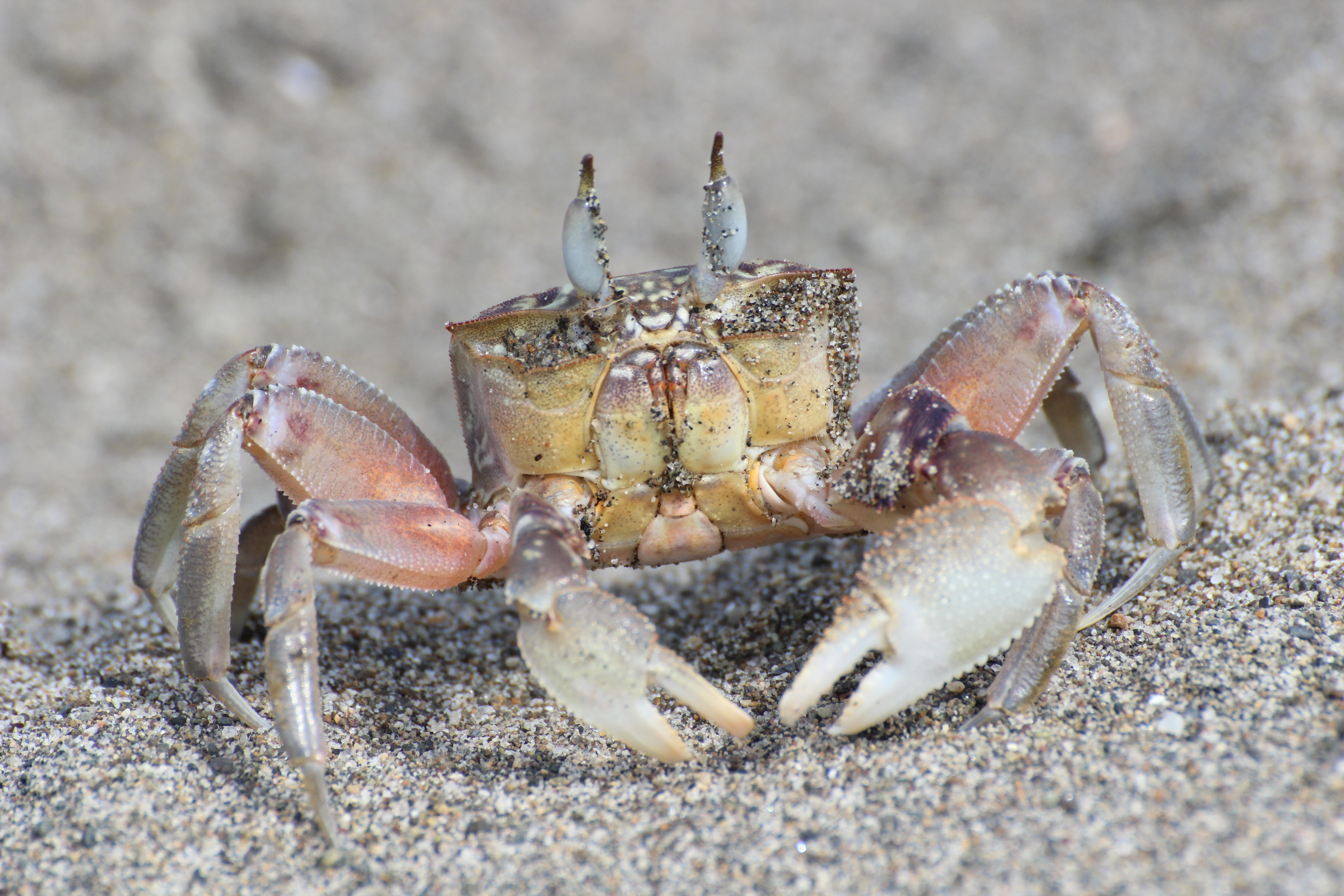
Different colouring, Peru

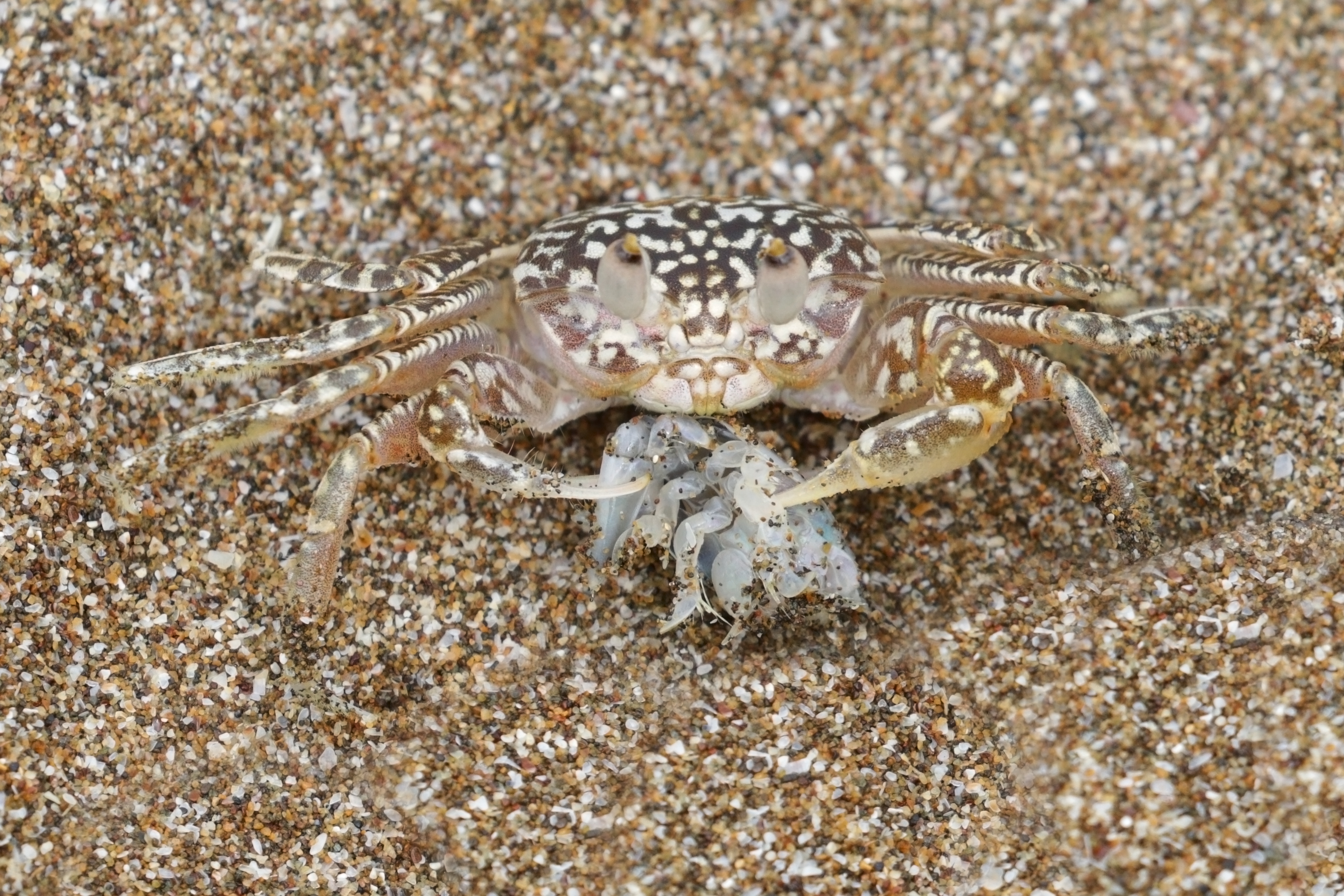
An adult Ocypode gaudichaudii eating
