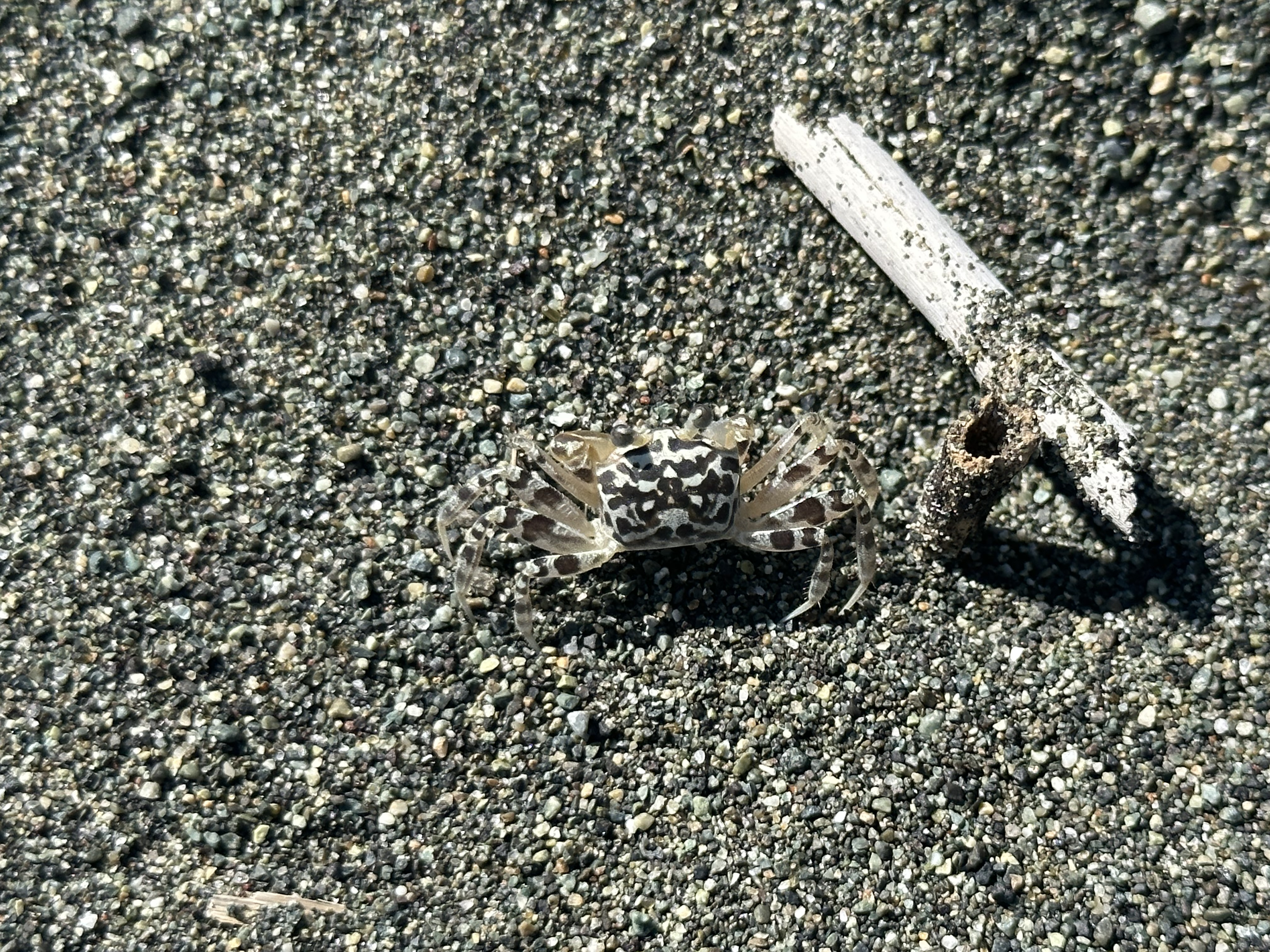
- In Japan

Scientific classification
- Kingdom: Animalia
- Phylum: Arthropoda
- Clade: Pancrustacea
- Class: Malacostraca
- Order: Decapoda
- Suborder: Pleocyemata
- Infraorder: Brachyura
- Family: Ocypodidae
- Genus: Ocypode
- Species: O. stimpsoni

Binomial name
- Ocypode stimpsoni Ortmann, 1897

= Ocypode stimpsoni =

Species of crab

Ocypode stimpsoni is a small-sized species of crab found in China, the Korean Peninsula, and Japan. It closely resembles O. mortoni but can easily be distinguished because it lacks styles on its eyestalks.
