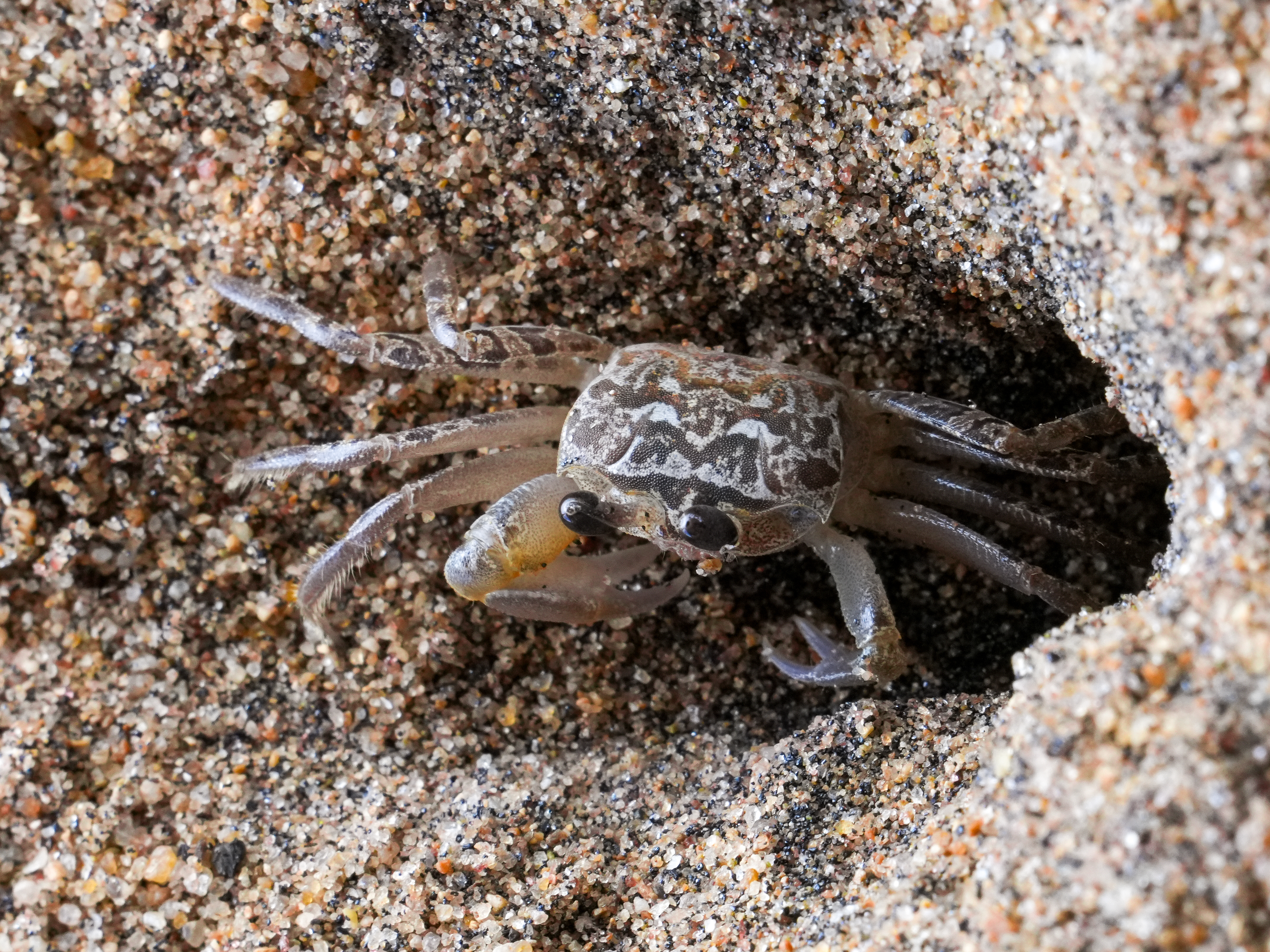
- Ocypode pallidula and burrow, Mahabalipuram, India
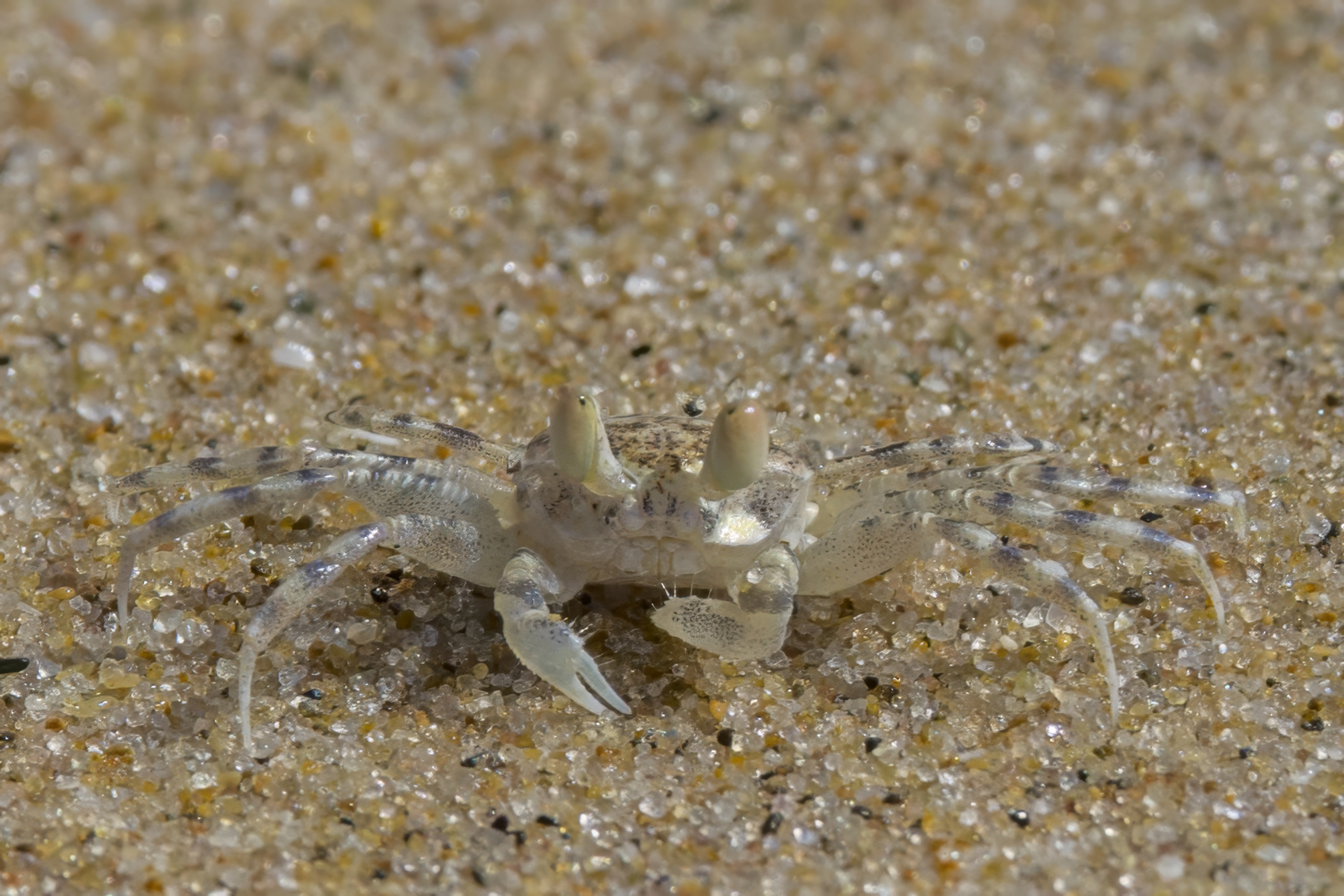
- In Mozambique

Scientific classification
- Kingdom: Animalia
- Phylum: Arthropoda
- Class: Malacostraca
- Order: Decapoda
- Suborder: Pleocyemata
- Infraorder: Brachyura
- Family: Ocypodidae
- Genus: Ocypode
- Species: O. pallidula

Binomial name
- Ocypode pallidula Jacquinot in Hombron & Jacquinot, 1846

= Ocypode pallidula =

Species of crab

Ocypode pallidula, the pallid ghost crab, is a small ghost crab that digs burrows in beaches of the Indo-Pacific region. Its carapace is usually about 1 inch (25 mm) wide. Their name means pale.

They build burrows by flipping excavated sand in a fan shape.
