= Xenophthalmidae =

Scientific classification
- Kingdom: Animalia
- Phylum: Arthropoda
- Class: Malacostraca
- Order: Decapoda
- Suborder: Pleocyemata
- Infraorder: Brachyura
- Superfamily: Ocypodoidea
- Family: Xenophthalmidae; Stimpson, 1858

Family of crustaceans

Xenophthalmidae is a family of crabs belonging to the superfamily Ocypodoidea.

== Genera ==
The family has three genera in two subfamilies:

- Subfamily Anomalifrontinae Rathbun, 1931
  - Anomalifrons Rathbun, 1931
- Subfamily Xenophthalminae Stimpson, 1858
  - Neoxenophthalmus Serène & Umali, 1972
  - Xenophthalmus White, 1846
