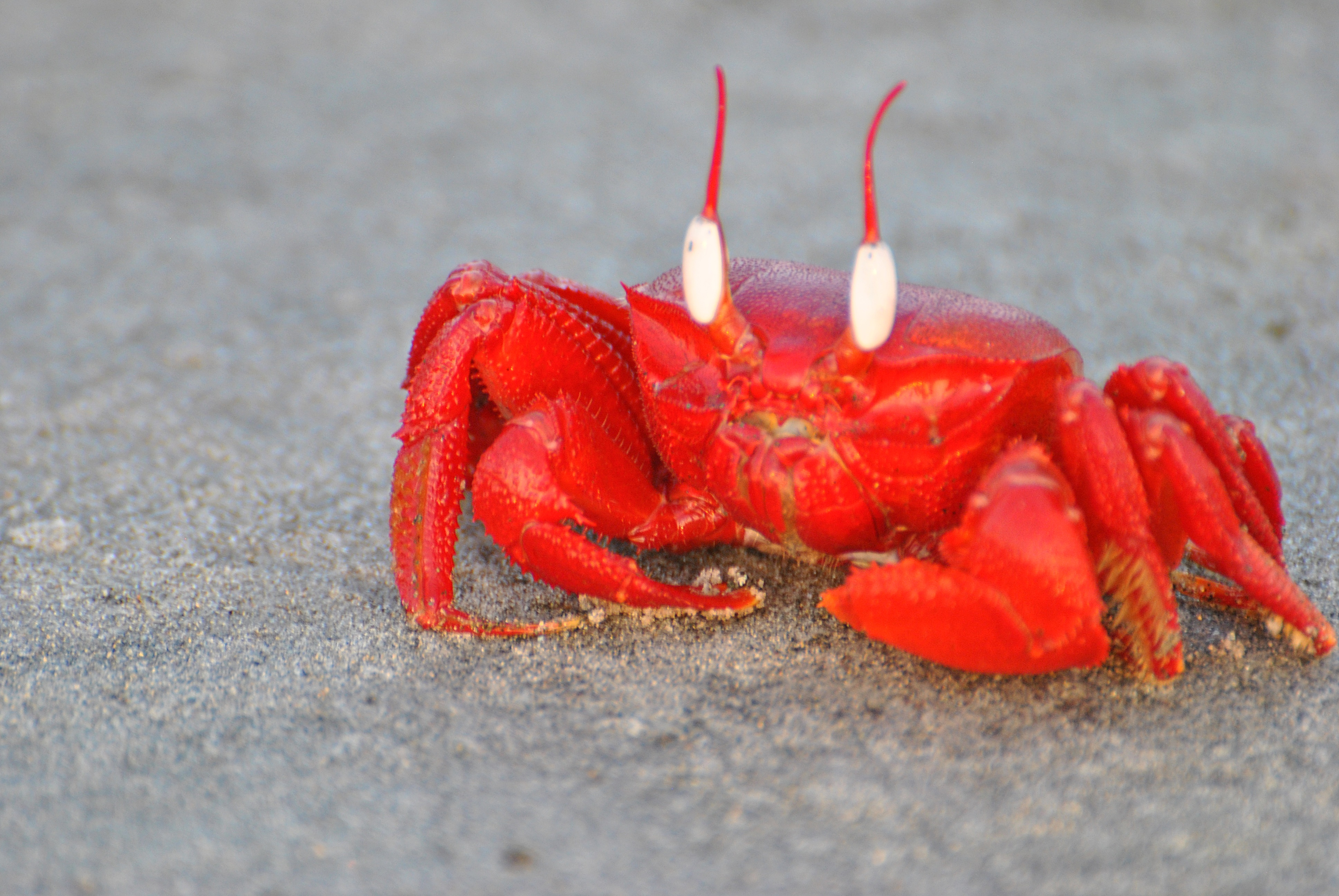

Scientific classification
- Kingdom: Animalia
- Phylum: Arthropoda
- Clade: Pancrustacea
- Class: Malacostraca
- Order: Decapoda
- Suborder: Pleocyemata
- Infraorder: Brachyura
- Family: Ocypodidae
- Genus: Ocypode
- Species: O. macrocera

Binomial name
- Ocypode macrocera H. Milne Edwards, 1837

= Ocypode macrocera =

Species of crab

Ocypode macrocera, the red ghost crab, is a species of crab in the family Ocypodidae. It is a medium-sized species of Ocypode found in Pakistan, India (including the Nicobar Islands), Bangladesh, Sri Lanka, and Myanmar. In adult males, the outer edges of the eye orbits are tooth-shaped and project forward. The palm of the claws are densely covered with tubercles on the upper surface, with distinctively serrated upper and lower margins. The stridulating ridge has 35 to 56 tubercles with striae. The tip of the smaller claw is characteristically blunt. Their eyestalks possess styles.

== See also ==
- Christmas Island red crab
