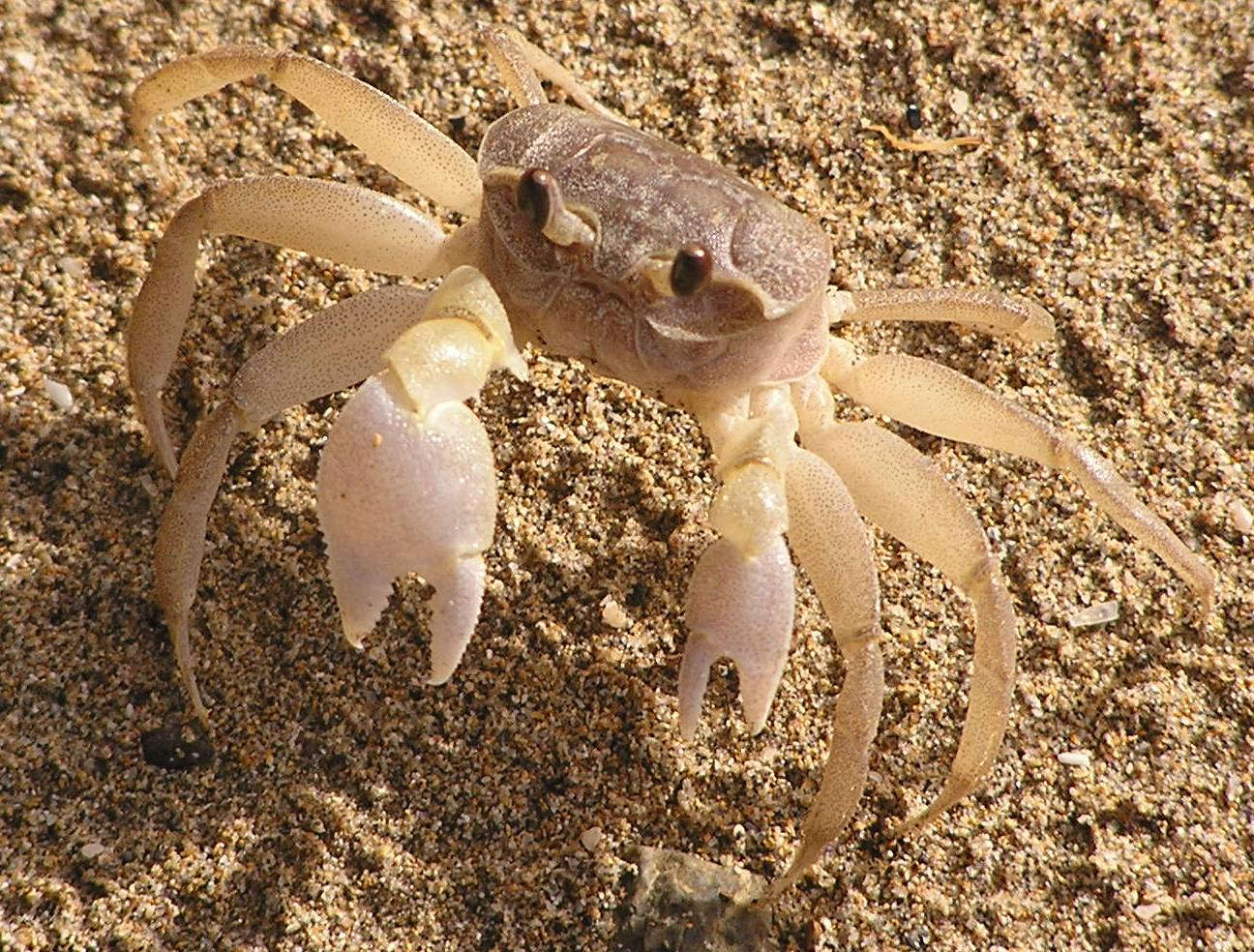

Scientific classification
- Kingdom: Animalia
- Phylum: Arthropoda
- Clade: Pancrustacea
- Class: Malacostraca
- Order: Decapoda
- Suborder: Pleocyemata
- Infraorder: Brachyura
- Family: Ocypodidae
- Genus: Ocypode
- Species: O. cordimana

Binomial name
- Ocypode cordimana Latreille, 1818

Synonyms
- Ocypode cordimana

= Ocypode cordimana =

Species of crab

Ocypode cordimana is a species of crab in the family Ocypodidae, sometimes called the smooth-handed ghost crab. It is widely distributed in the Indian Ocean and Pacific Ocean.
