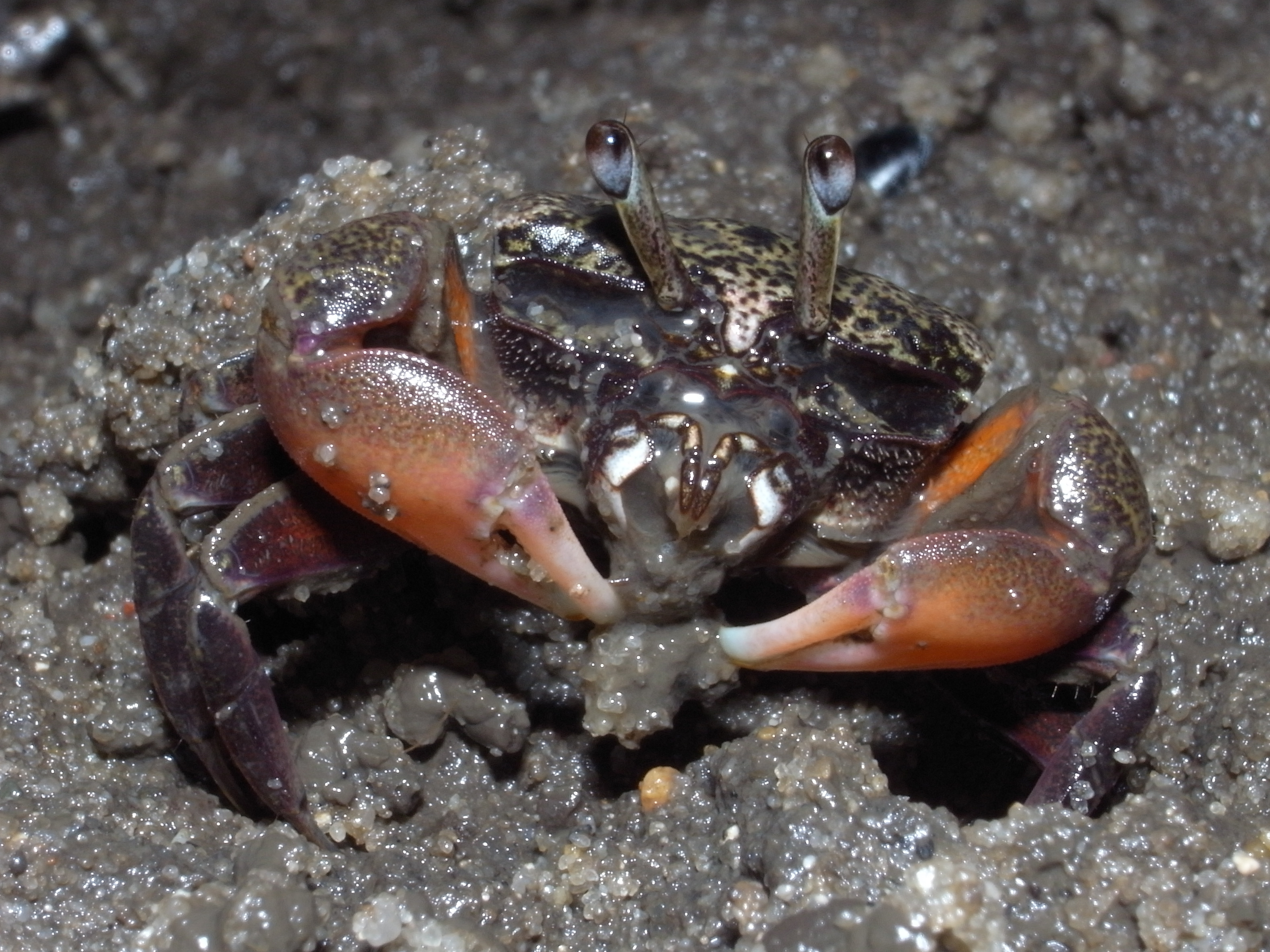

Scientific classification
- Kingdom: Animalia
- Phylum: Arthropoda
- Clade: Pancrustacea
- Class: Malacostraca
- Order: Decapoda
- Suborder: Pleocyemata
- Infraorder: Brachyura
- Section: Eubrachyura
- Subsection: Thoracotremata
- Superfamily: Ocypodoidea
- Family: Heloeciidae; H. Milne-Edwards, 1852
- Genus: Heloecius; Dana, 1851
- Species: H. cordiformis

Binomial name
- Heloecius cordiformis (H. Milne-Edwards, 1837)

Synonyms
- Gelasimus cordiformis H. Milne-Edwards, 1837; Heloecius areolatus Heller, 1862; Heloecius inornatus Dana, 1851; Heloecius signatus Hess, 1865

= Heloecius =

Genus of crabs

Heloecius cordiformis is a species of semiterrestrial crab found in mangrove swamps and mudflats along the east coast of Australia. Adults are around 25 mm (1 in) wide, with males being larger and having larger and more conspicuously coloured claws. The males wave their claws to communicate with other crabs, giving them their common name of semaphore crab. They can breathe both in air and under water, and feed at low tide on detritus in the sediment. H. cordiformis is the only species in the genus Heloecius and the family Heloeciidae.

== Description ==
Adults of H. cordiformis are around 25 mm (1 in) wide, with a dark purple, mottled carapace. The compound eyes are on long eyestalks.

The claws are sexually dimorphic, with males' claws showing positive allometry, while females' claws grow isometrically; a male's claws thus become proportionally larger as the crab grows, becoming much larger than those of females. The colour of the claws is correlated with both sex and size. The smallest crabs have green claws, followed by orange and pink, with the largest male crabs having purple claws; females with purple claws have small claws. The purple colour is the easiest of the four to distinguish against the reflectance spectrum of the mudflats on which the crabs live.

== Distribution ==
Heloecius cordiformis lives from Brisbane (Queensland), along the coast of New South Wales to Port Philip Bay (Victoria), as well as eastern parts of Tasmania.

== Ecology and behaviour ==
Heloecius cordiformis lives in intertidal mangroves, and in estuaries, where it is the most abundant crab species, usually living among the roots of the mangroves. H. cordiformis can breathe both in air and in water. While out of the water, H. cordiformis moves its carapace up and down; this capability allows the crab to breathe air without losing the water held in the gill chamber under the carapace.

Heloecius cordiformis is primarily a deposit feeder, sifting through the sediment for organic matter and the detritus from mangroves, but also has large mandibles that it uses to eat larger pieces of plants and animals. Both males and females use their claws alternately; while one is transferring food to the mouthparts, the other claw is collecting more material. Predators of H. cordiformis include a variety of birds and fish.

Males signal to other crabs by waving their brightly coloured claws, which gives the species its common name of "semaphore crab".

== Systematics ==
Heloecius cordiformis was first described as Gelasimus cordiformis by Henri Milne-Edwards, in the family Ocypodidae (Gelasimus is now a subgenus of Uca). It was transferred to a new genus by James Dwight Dana in 1851, alongside a newly described species, H. inornatus. A 1983 study concluded that Heloecius was the most primitive of the crabs in the family Ocypodidae, and erected a new subfamily for the genus, which was later raised to the rank of family, as Heloeciidae. Dana's H. inornatus and other species described in the genus are all considered taxonomic synonyms of H. cordiformis.

== See also ==
- Ghost crab
