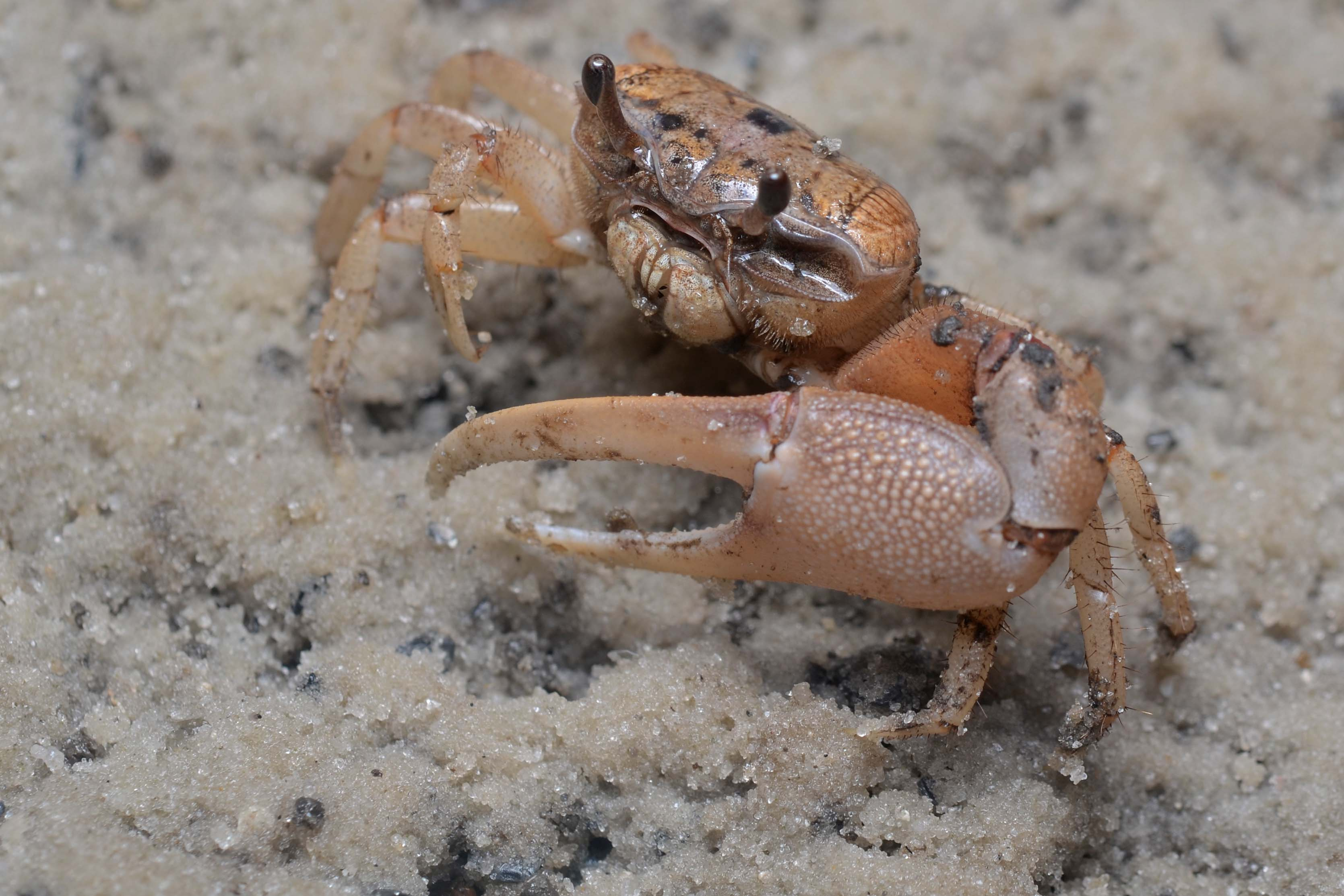
- Leptuca pugilator, Florida
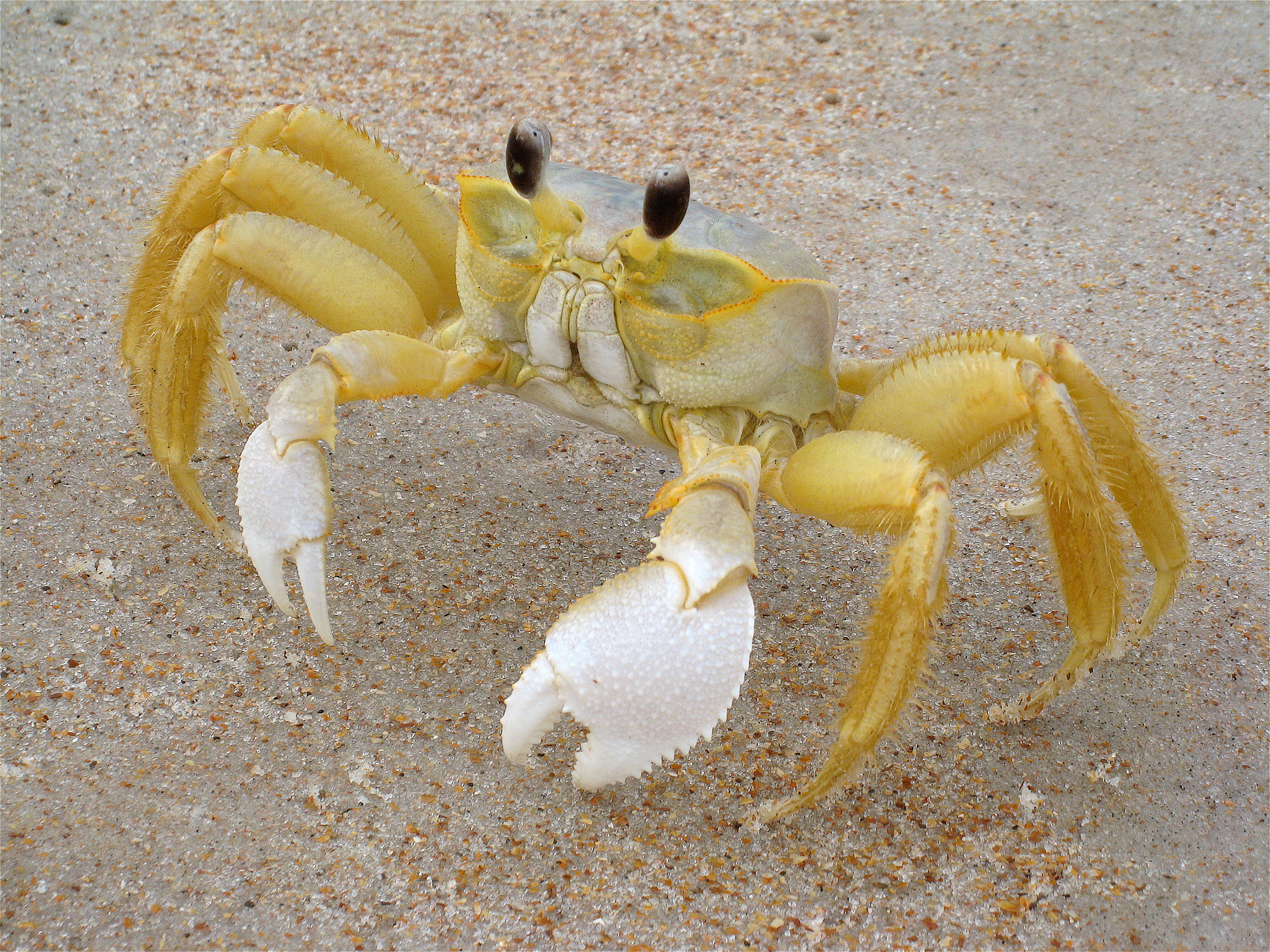
- Ocypode quadrata, Florida

Scientific classification
- Kingdom: Animalia
- Phylum: Arthropoda
- Clade: Pancrustacea
- Class: Malacostraca
- Order: Decapoda
- Suborder: Pleocyemata
- Infraorder: Brachyura
- Superfamily: Ocypodoidea
- Family: Ocypodidae; Rafinesque, 1815

Subfamilies
- Gelasiminae Miers, 1886; Ocypodinae Rafinesque, 1815; Ucidinae Števčić, 2005; Ucinae Dana, 1851

= Ocypodidae =

Family of crabs

The Ocypodidae (from Ancient Greek ὠκύς (okús), meaning "swift", and πούς (poús), meaning "foot") is a family of semiterrestrial crabs that includes ghost crabs and fiddler crabs. These crabs are found along tropical and temperate shorelines worldwide.

Some genera previously classified within the Ocypodidae family have been reclassified into separate families within the superfamily Ocypoidea, such as Dotillidae and Macrophthalmidae. In 2016, the genus Uca was divided into 13 genera through the elevation of its subgenera to genus status, among other taxonomic changes. Further refinements have been made to the family's organization, resulting in 4 subfamilies, approximately 13 extant genera, and around 180 described species as of 2020.

The majority of the Ocypodidae species are fiddler crabs, the exceptions being the members of the genus Ocypode, ghost crabs, and the genus Ucides, mangrove crabs.

== Genera ==
These genera belong to the family Ocypodidae:

- Afruca Crane, 1975
- Austruca Bott, 1973
- Cranuca Beinlich & von Hagen, 2006
- Gelasimus Stimpson 1862
- Leptuca Bott, 1973
- Minuca Bott, 1954
- Ocypode Weber, 1795 - (ghost crabs)
- Paraleptuca Bott, 1973
- Petruca N.g.Shih & Christy, 2015
- Tubuca Bott, 1973
- Uca Leach, 1814
- Ucides Rathbun, 1897 - (mangrove crabs)
- Xeruca Shih, 2015
- † Chondromaia Feldmann, et al., 2013
- † Eoinachoides Van Straelan, 1933
- † Micromaia Bittner, 1875
- † Mithracia Bell, 1858
- † Nanomaja Müller & Collins, 1991
- † Panticarcinus Collins & Saward, 2006
- † Periacanthus Bittner, 1875
- † Pisomaja Lorenthey, 1929
- † Wilsonimaia Blow & Manning, 1996
