= Gnaraloo Wilderness Foundation =

Non-governmental organization

Gnaraloo Wilderness Foundation (GWF)
- Founded: 2016
- Type: non-profit organization
- Purpose: Conservation and research
- Location: Gnaraloo, Western Australia
- Website: gnaraloo.org

The Gnaraloo Wilderness Foundation (GWF) is a non-profit organization aimed at protecting and preserving the native flora and fauna at Gnaraloo with the mission to Keep Gnaraloo Wild. The goal of the GWF is to maintain these pristine habitats and allow native wildlife to flourish.

The GWF is triple bottom line:

- Progressive environmental effects through collaborative scientific research
- Responsible social response through community and school engagement, internships, and volunteer opportunities
- Positive economic outcomes through responsible wilderness tourism which supports conservation

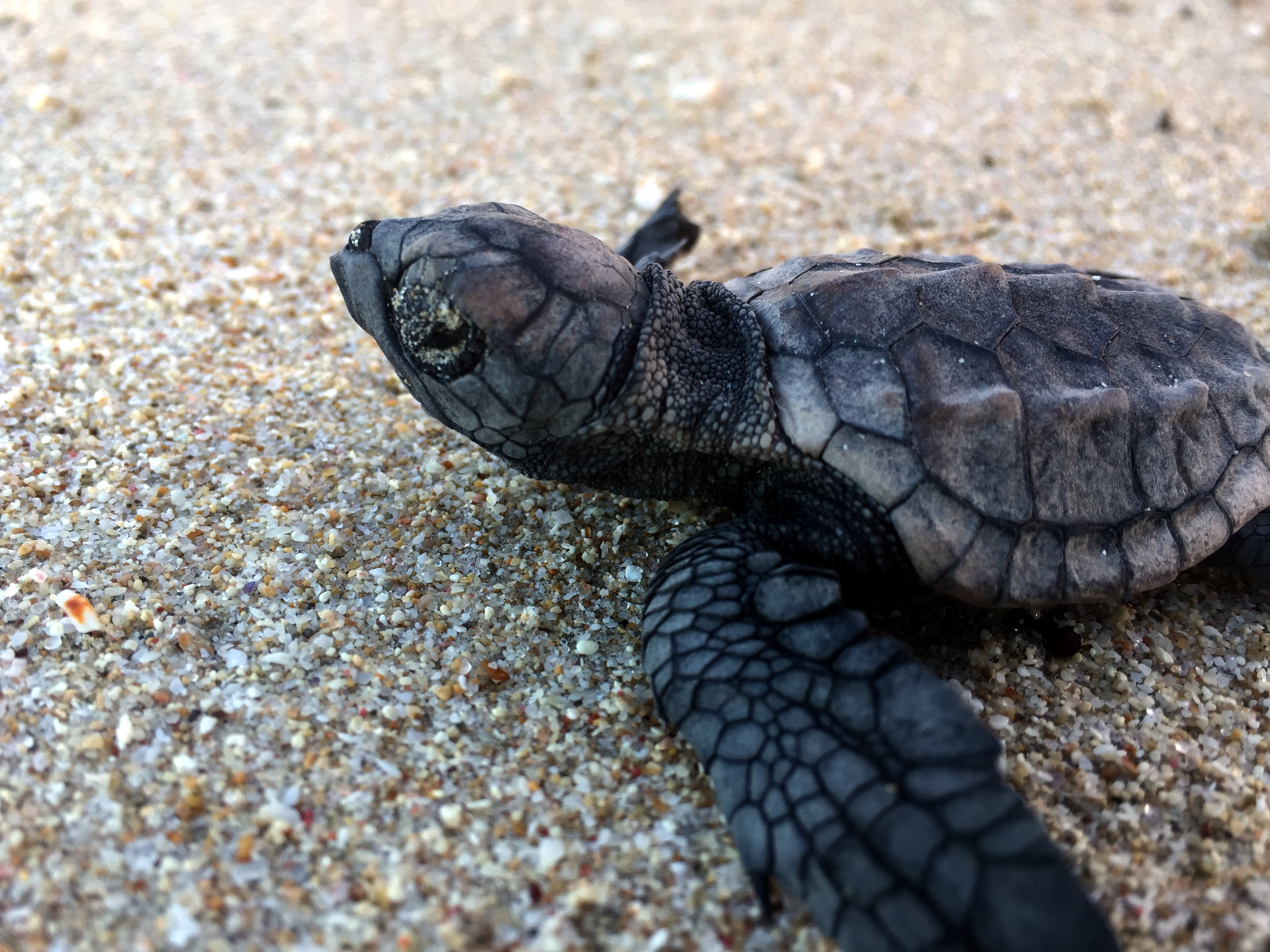
Loggerhead hatchling at Gnaraloo Bay

== History ==
Gnaraloo is a remote and undeveloped section of Western Australian coastline, located at the southern extreme of the Ningaloo Reef Marine Park. This conjunction of rugged outback and desert beach is home to threatened sea turtles, a World Heritage coral reef, and an immense diversity of birds and other native terrestrial and marine life.

In 2005, the Gnaraloo Station Trust purchased the land and initiated efforts to preserve the unspoiled environment at Gnaraloo.

In early 2016, the non-profit Gnaraloo Wilderness Foundation was officially created to actively work towards the conservation of this natural and undeveloped stretch of coast.

== Research and conservation ==
The GWF runs the Gnaraloo Turtle Conservation Program (GTCP), and the Gnaraloo Feral Animal Control Program to protect sea turtle rookeries along the Gnaraloo coast.

The population of loggerhead turtles that nests in Western Australia belongs to the South-East Indian Ocean subpopulation. A lot of basic but critical biological data still remains unknown for this population, including the number of individuals, how often females nest, and where they migrate to forage once they leave the rookery. By working to preserve the natural ecosystems at Gnaraloo, the GWF is helping to protect species that occur within them.

In addition to scientific fieldwork, a vital component of the GWF is community engagement. Education and widespread awareness of environmental issues provides a connection that can inspire conservation. In the field at Gnaraloo, community members and school groups are invited to join the GTCP on beach surveys to learn about daily monitoring techniques and applied science. Once the nesting season concludes, the GTCP then travels along the coast, stopping at various Western Australia cities to give presentations to thousands of students about sea turtle biology and conservation.

== See also ==
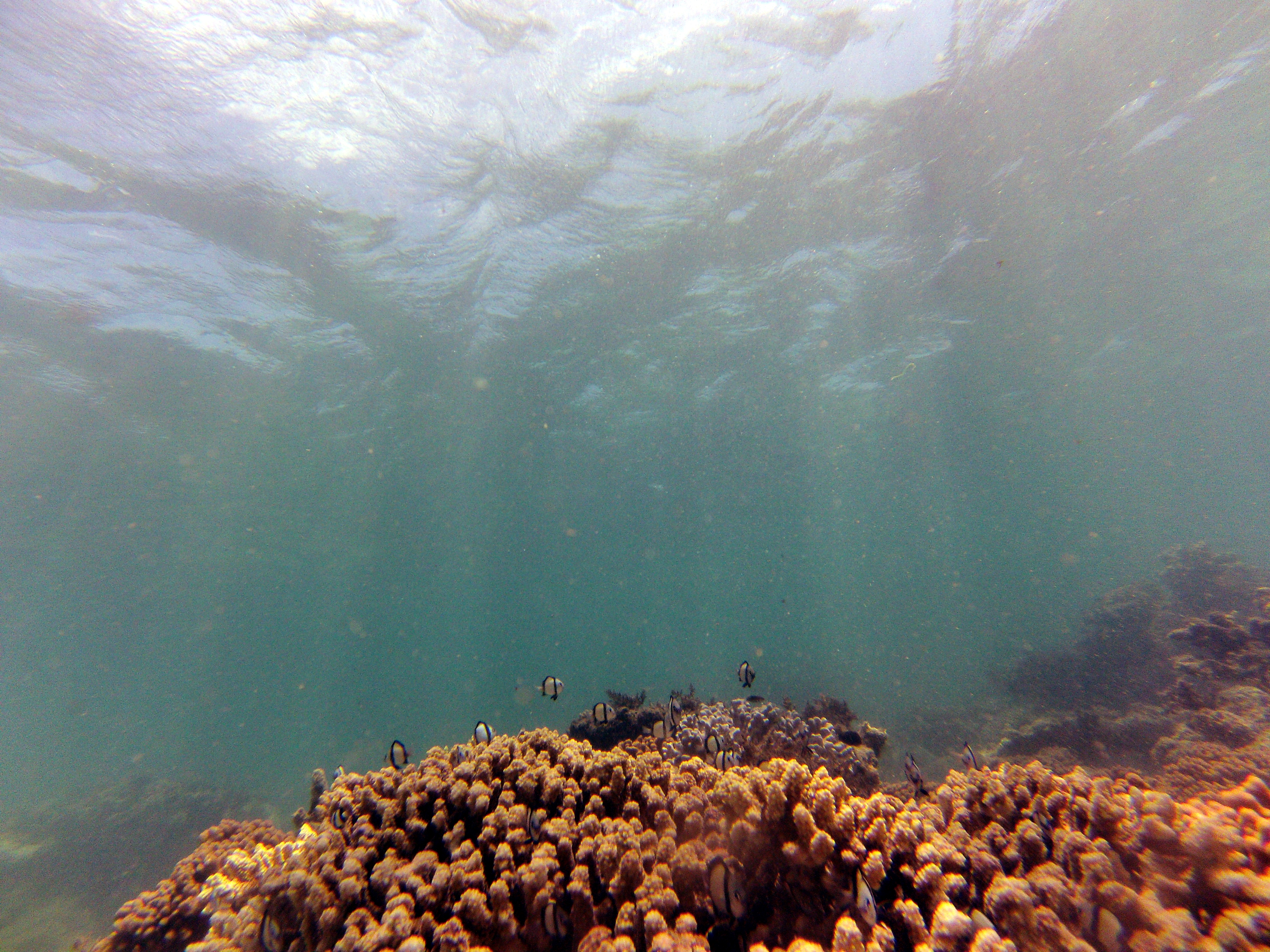
- Corals and reef fish at Gnaraloo
  Threats to sea turtles
