= Gnaraloo Feral Animal Control Program =

The GFACP logo

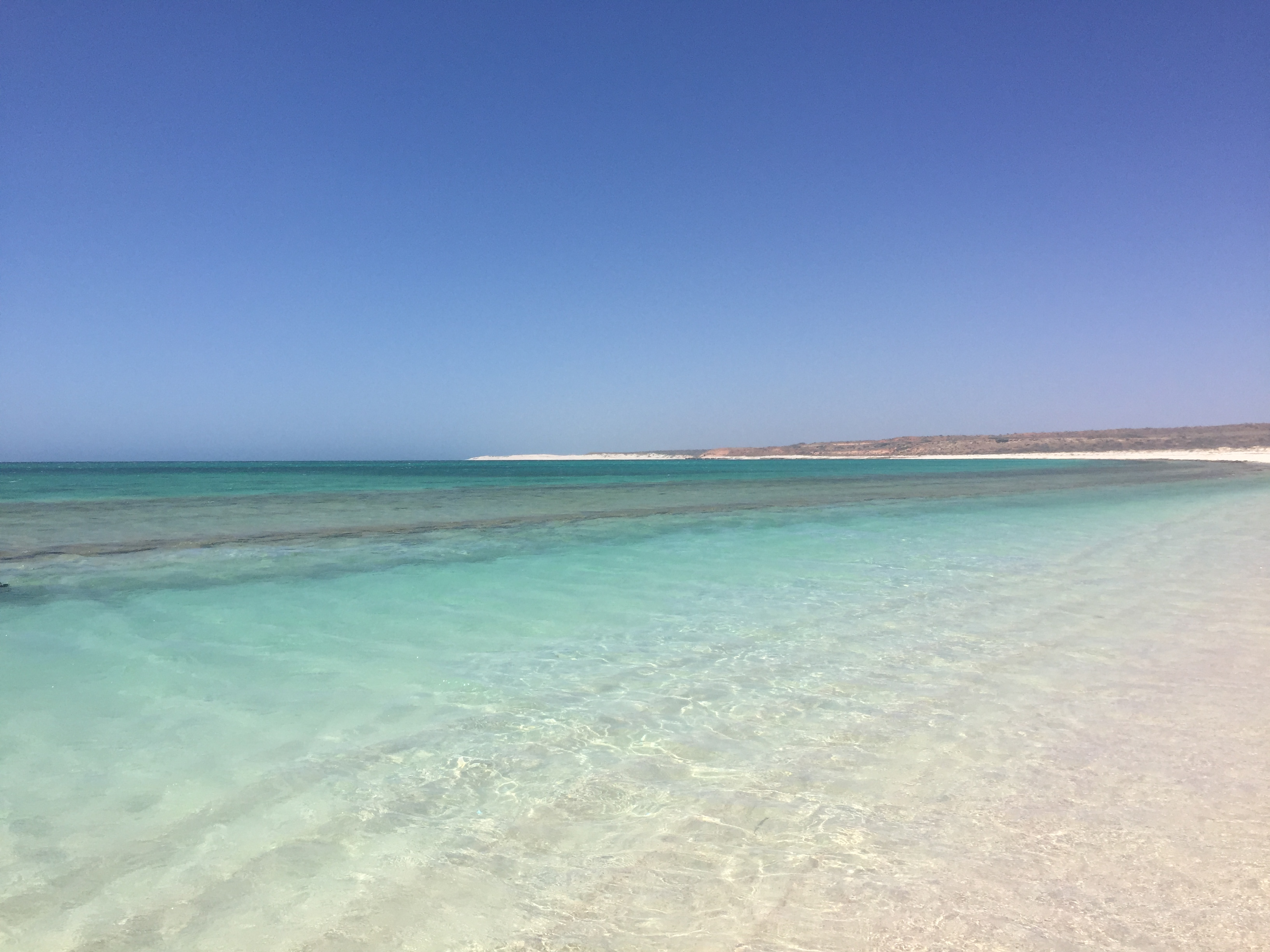
Gnaraloo Bay

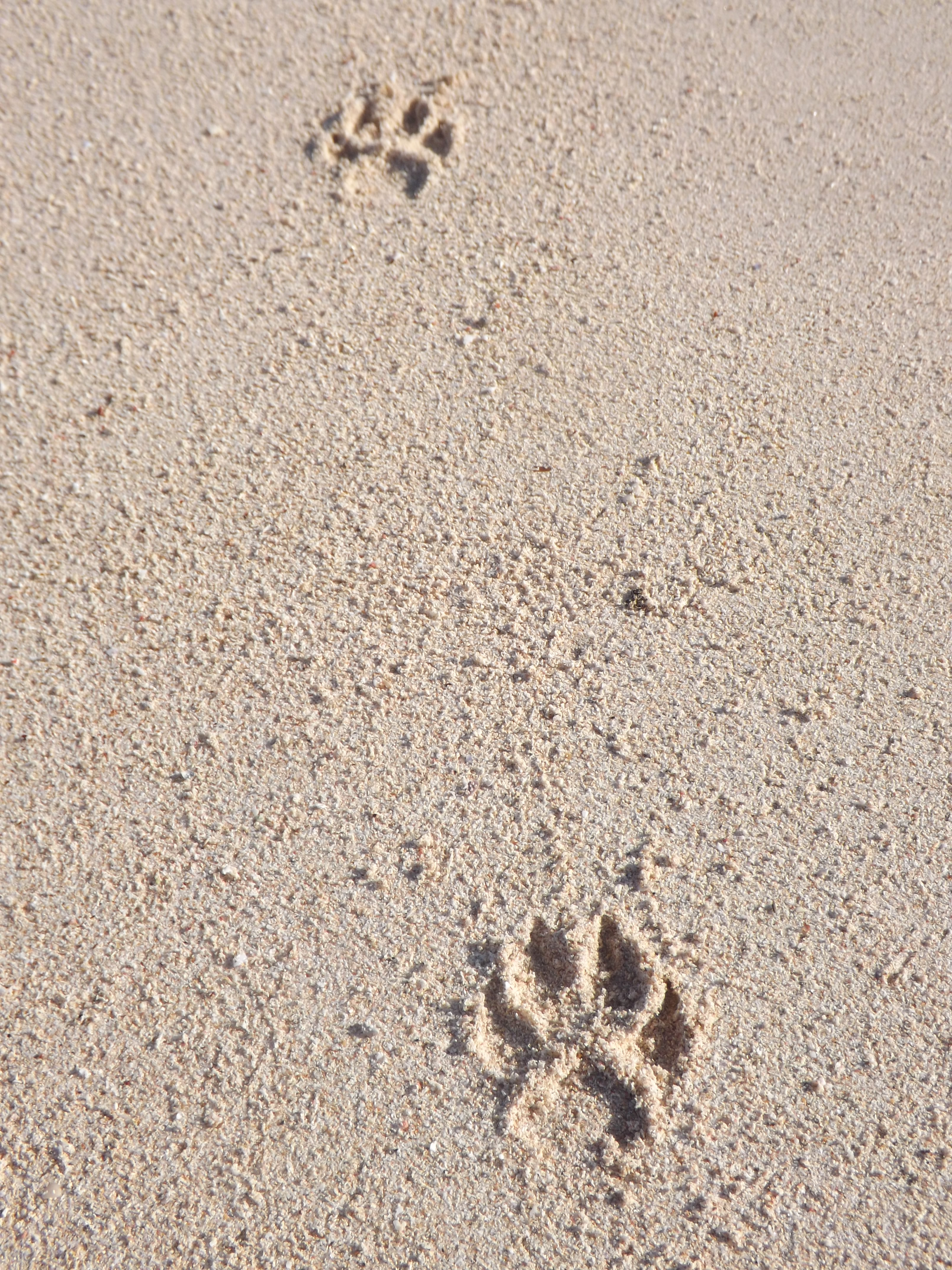
Wild dog tracks in the Gnaraloo Bay Rookery

The Gnaraloo Feral Animal Control Program (GFACP) operates in conjunction with the Gnaraloo Turtle Conservation Program (GTCP), a non-governmental organization whose aim is to monitor and protect sea turtle nesting beaches along the coast of Gnaraloo. Since its implementation in 2009, the GFACP has worked to reduce the impact of feral predators on sea turtle nests within these rookeries. Gnaraloo is located at the southern end of the Ningaloo Coast, a World Heritage Site. The Ningaloo Reef and surrounding coastline are home to important wildlife, including vulnerable and endangered sea turtle populations.

== Threats to sea turtle nests & hatchlings ==
Sea turtles are listed under the Environment Protection and Biodiversity Conservation Act 1999, and are recognized as nationally significant species in Australia. The predation of sea turtle eggs and hatchlings is a threatening process for these conservation-dependent species. Because a threshold of feral presence in the rookery where predation does not occur is currently unknown, any evidence of non-native predators in the vicinity of sea turtle nests suggests that predation is likely.

The Australian Department of Parks and Wildlife has recognized that feral predators have a significant impact on threatened species, specifically stating that fox predation may cause up to 70% mortality of sea turtle nests on beaches within the region.

Together, the GTCP and GFACP work to preserve the loggerhead turtle (Caretta caretta) population that nests at Gnaraloo by controlling non-native and feral predators of sea turtle eggs and hatchlings, namely the European red fox (Vulpes vulpes), feral cats, and wild dogs. Throughout nesting season each year, the GTCP scientific field team tracks and records any evidence of feral activity or predation (e.g. eggshells, dead hatchlings outside of nest cavity) within the rookeries. The GFACP has been extremely effective in reducing and removing threats posed by feral animals within Gnaraloo’s sea turtle rookeries. Since the 2010/2011 nesting season, the program has eradicated feral predation, maintaining 100% protection of sea turtle nests.

The continually successful protection of sea turtle nests at Gnaraloo demonstrates that sea turtle rookeries can be preserved through effective and consistent feral animal control programs.
