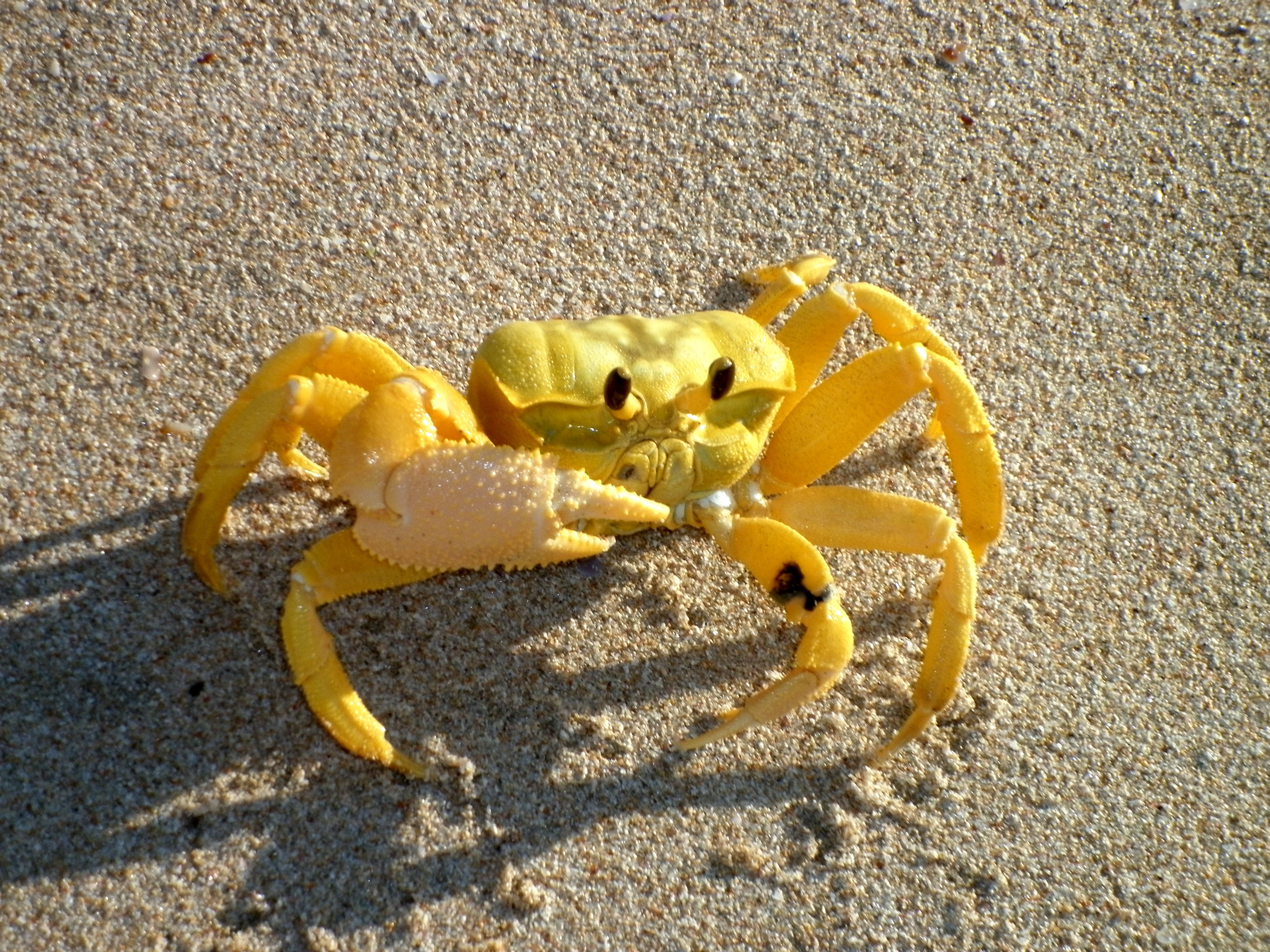
- A golden ghost crab from Gnaraloo, Western Australia
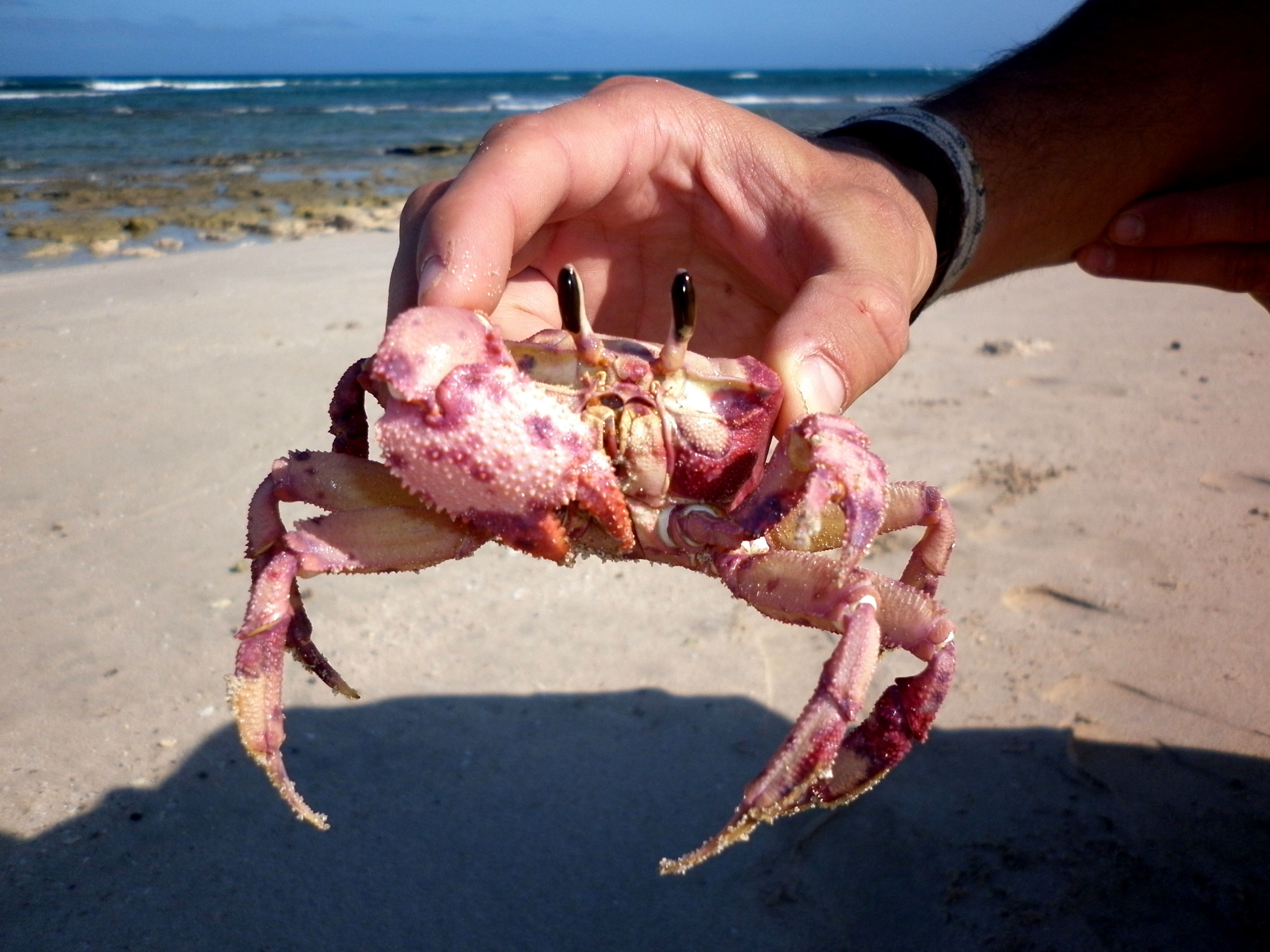
- A golden ghost crab covered with epibiotic growth, making it appear pink

Scientific classification
- Kingdom: Animalia
- Phylum: Arthropoda
- Clade: Pancrustacea
- Class: Malacostraca
- Order: Decapoda
- Suborder: Pleocyemata
- Infraorder: Brachyura
- Family: Ocypodidae
- Genus: Ocypode
- Species: O. convexa

Binomial name
- Ocypode convexa Quoy & Gaimard, 1824
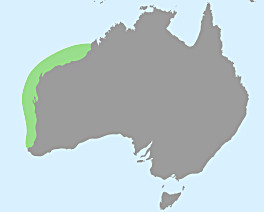
- Ocypode convexa distribution range (in green)

Synonyms
- Ocypode bombée H. Milne-Edwards, 1837; Ocypode pygoides Ortmann, 1894a

= Golden ghost crab =

Species of crustacean

Ocypode convexa, commonly known as the golden ghost crab, or alternatively the western ghost crab or yellow ghost crab, is a species of ghost crabs endemic to the coast of Western Australia, from Broome to Perth. They are relatively large ghost crabs, with a carapace growing up to 45 mm (1.8 in) long and 52 mm (2.0 in) wide. They are easily recognisable by their golden yellow colouration. Like other ghost crabs they have box-like bodies with unequally sized claws. They also have large eyestalks with the cornea occupying most of the bottom part.

Golden ghost crabs are common inhabitants of open sandy beaches, living in burrows in the intertidal and supratidal zones. They are predominantly nocturnal and semi-terrestrial. They are a generalist species, feeding on carrion and debris, as well as preying on small animals. Along with the red fox (Vulpes vulpes), they are significant as one of the main predators of eggs and hatchlings of Western Australian sea turtles, particularly the Endangered loggerhead sea turtle (Caretta caretta) which has one of the largest rookeries in the region.

== Classification ==
Ocypode convexa is classified under the genus Ocypode in the ghost crab subfamily Ocypodinae of the family Ocypodidae. It was first described by the French naturalists Jean René Constant Quoy and Joseph Paul Gaimard in 1824 as Ocypode convexus. (Note: The specific name has been emended to Ocypode convexa because the grammatical gender of the genus Ocypode is feminine. The International Code of Zoological Nomenclature requires gender agreement between the specific name and the generic name.) The type specimens were recovered from Dirk Hartog Island, Shark Bay, Western Australia, during the circumnavigational voyage of the French corvettes Uranie and Physicienne (1817–1820) under the command of Louis de Freycinet.

=== Etymology ===
While the specific name is derived from Latin convexus ("vaulted" or "domed"). The latter is a direct translation of Quoy and Gaimard's "French name" of the species, Ocypode bombé, referring to the dome-like shape of the carapace.

They are commonly known as the "golden ghost crab". They are also sometimes referred to as the "western ghost crab", or the "yellow ghost crab".

=== Taxonomic history ===
The species was more widely known in scientific literature by its junior synonym Ocypode pygoides in the early 20th century due to the uncertainty regarding the original descriptions and illustrations by Quoy and Gaimard.

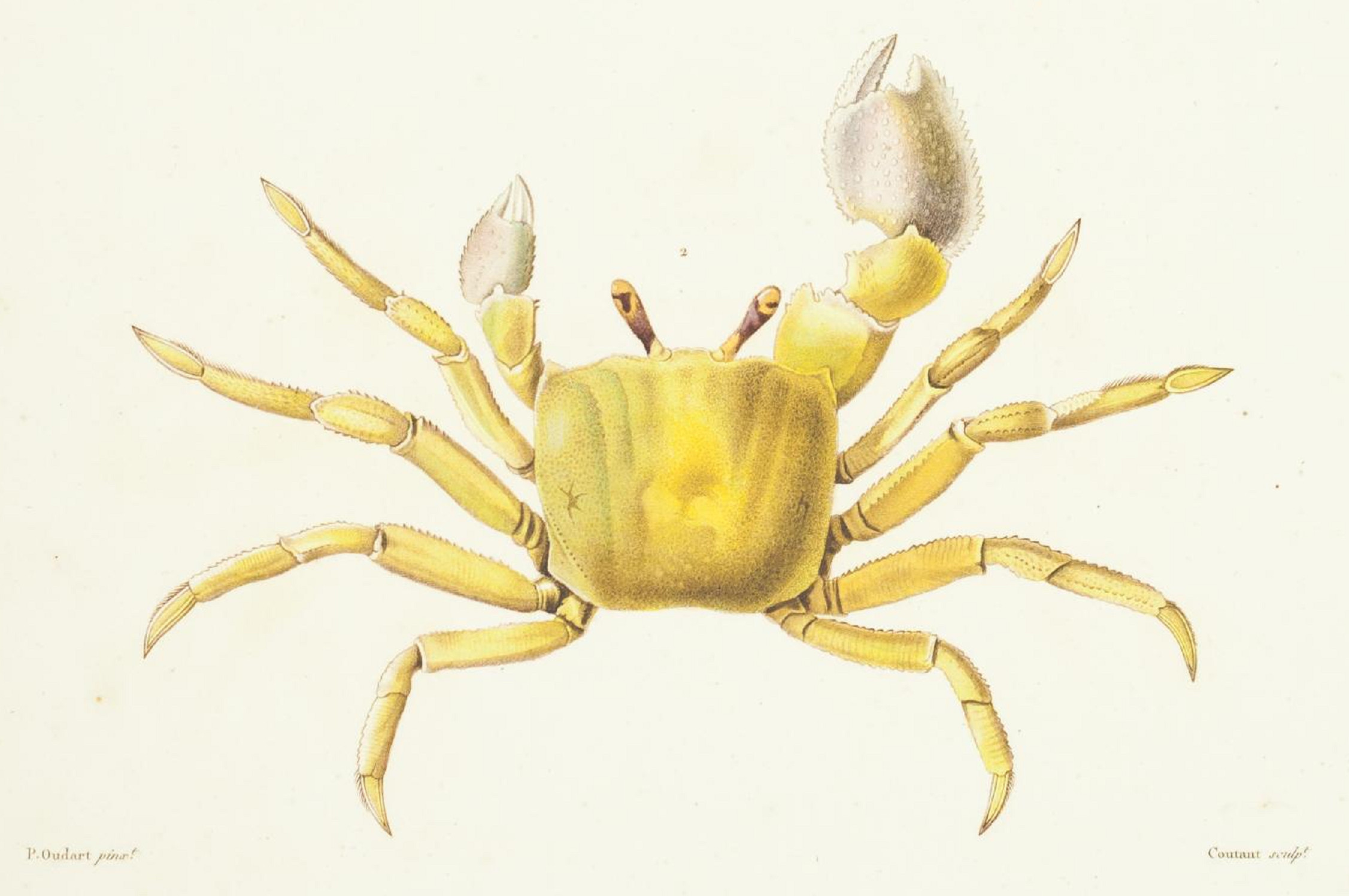
Jean René Constant Quoy and Joseph Paul Gaimard's original 1824 illustration of Ocypode convexa

In 1837, the French zoologist Henri Milne-Edwards used Quoy and Gaimard's French "translation" of the name, Ocypode bombé (writing it as Ocypode bombée), instead of the Latin name, Ocypode convexus. However, he also declared that the species "hadn't been described or illustrated in enough detail for it to be recognised in some way". (Note: French:"... n'a pas été décrite ni figurée avec assez de détail pour pouvoir être reconnue d'une manière certaine.") The British zoologist Edward J. Miers also regarded it as a possible synonym of either Ocypode kuhlii or Ocypode cordimanus in 1882, again due to the vagueness of the original descriptions. In 1894, the Prussian-American zoologist Arnold Edward Ortmann described Ocypode pygoides without consulting Quoy and Gaimard's original work. Although he did posit the possibility that Ocypode pygoides and Ocypode convexa might actually be the same species later on in 1897. (Note: German: "Nach der Localität und dem Habitusbild wäre es möglich, dass diese Art dieselbe ist wie pygoides. Beschreibung und Abbildung geben aber keine Einzelheiten, die dies gewiss machen könnten." (English: "After the locality and habitus image, it is possible that this species is the same as pygoides. But the descriptions and illustrations do not provide any details that could make this certain."))

In 1957, due to the discovery of a name conflict with an unrelated crab species also originally described as Ocypode convexus (Note: As Ocypode (Chasmagnathus) convexus, now valid as Chasmagnathus convexus) by the Dutch zoologist Wilhem de Haan in 1833, the International Commission on Zoological Nomenclature (ICZN) suppressed Quoy and Gaimard's Ocypode convexus. This ruling was made on the basis that the consulted specialists regarded Quoy and Gaimard's Ocypode convexus as nomen dubium.

It wasn't until 1965 when the Australian carcinologists Ray W. George and Mary E. Knott finally clarified the confusion surrounding the name by demonstrating that Ocypode pygoides and Ocypode convexa were identical and formally synonymised the former with the latter. The name Ocypode convexa is now regarded as the valid name and the species has been referred to as such in subsequent publications.

Ocypode stimsponii, a different species found in East Asia, was also initially described by the American zoologist William Stimpson as Ocypode convexa in 1858. Like de Haan, Stimpson was unaware that the name had already been used previously by Quoy and Gaimard. Ortmann realised that Stimpson's name for the species was a junior homonym in 1897 and renamed the species Ocypode stimpsonii. Ocypode nobilii, another species from Southeast Asia, was also mistakenly identified as Ocypode convexa on its discovery in 1899 by the Italian carcinologist Giuseppe Nobili. In 1902, the Dutch biologist Johannes Govertus de Man recognised that it was actually a new species and named it Ocypode nobilii in honour of Nobili.

== Description ==
Golden ghost crabs are relatively large and robust ghost crabs with strong legs and claws. Their carapace is deep and box-like in shape, and can grow to a length of up to 45 mm (1.8 in) and a width of 52 mm (2.0 in). They are easily identifiable by their colouration. As their common name implies, the overall colour of golden ghost crabs is usually creamy white to a rich golden yellow with faint brown markings.

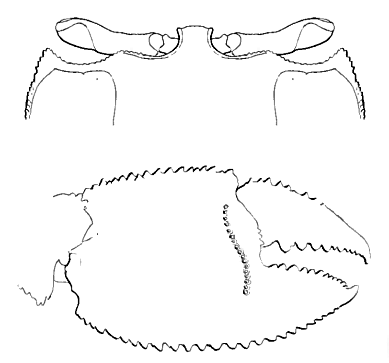
Ocypode convexa eyestalks and anterior profile of the carapace (top); and the stridulating ridge (a row of 19 to 24 tubercles) on the larger claw (bottom).

Like other ghost crabs, the eyestalks of golden ghost crabs are large and swollen, with the cornea occupying the lower surface. Their tips do not extend into a spike (style) making them easy to distinguish from the similarly sized horned ghost crab (Ocypode ceratophthalma) which also occurs in Western Australia. The upper margins of the eye orbits curve around the bases of the eyestalks, then gently curve again towards the sides of the carapace. The outer edges of the upper margins of the eye orbits are triangular in shape and distinctly pointing forward. The lower margins of the eye orbits have deep notches on the center and on the sides.

The carapace is wider than it is long, being broadest at the width between the outer edges of the eye orbits. The upper surface is covered densely with small bumps (tubercles) that gradually become sparser towards the anterolateral regions. The carapace bulges outward on the outer thirds and is separated from the central regions by shallow furrows.

As in other members of the family Ocypodidae, one of the claw appendages (chelipeds) of golden ghost crabs is much larger than the other. This occurs in both males and females, though the difference is much more pronounced in males.

The palm (propodus) (Note: The second to the last segment of crustacean appendages) of both larger and smaller chelipeds are covered coarsely with large irregularly-arranged tubercles on the outer surface, giving them a rough appearance. The larger claw is longer than it is wide, with its upper and lower edges possessing rows of spine-like tubercles, arranged irregularly on the upper margin and regularly on the lower margin. The inner surface of the palm of the larger claw in both sexes features stridulating (sound-producing) ridges, which is important for identifying different species within the subfamily Ocypodinae. In golden ghost crabs, the stridulating ridge is composed of a row of 19 to 24 tubercles. The smaller cheliped tapers towards a pointed end.

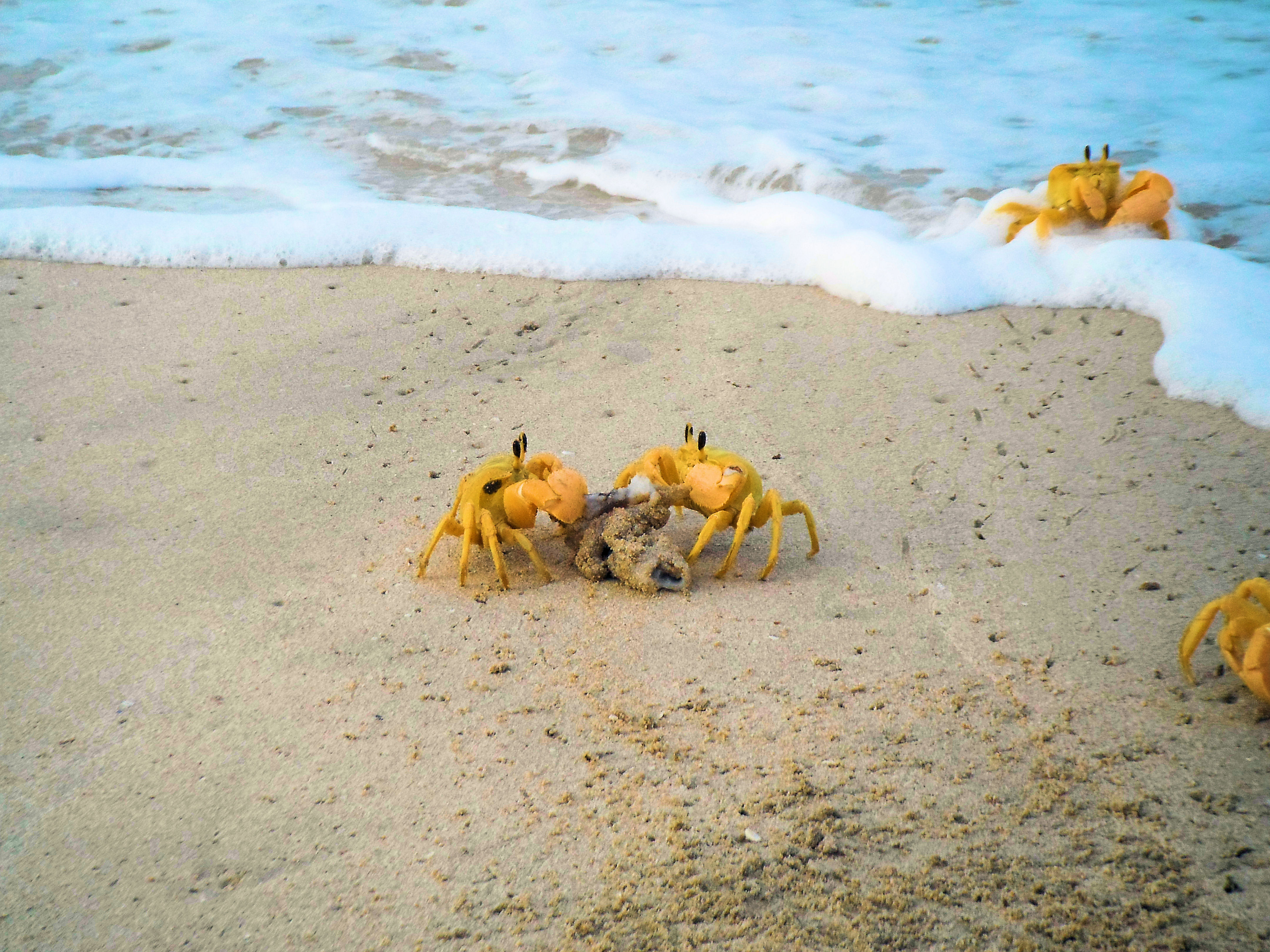
Golden ghost crabs eating a dead octopus

The propodi of the first and second pair of walking legs possess bristles (setae) on the upper surfaces and the upper margins, while the propodi of the third and fourth pair of walking legs are naked. The first gonopod (appendages modified into sexual organs) of the male is three-sided in cross-section at the base, narrowing towards a sideways-curving tip. A bulging palp is present at the sides near the tip. The rim of the genital opening in females is horn-shaped and located in front of the genital covering (operculum). The operculum is rounded in shape.

== Ecology and behaviour ==
Like other ghost crabs, golden ghost crabs are predominantly nocturnal, though they may sometimes emerge during the day. They are semi-terrestrial and breathe oxygen from the air through moistened gills. They must periodically wet their gills with seawater, usually by taking water from moist sand or by running into the surf and letting the waves wash over them. However, in 1962, the Australian zoologist William Ride reported golden ghost crabs foraging inland as far as 500 m (1,600 ft) away from the sea following heavy rains. This indicates that they are able to tolerate freshwater, and can still breathe by taking in moisture through wet vegetation. Golden ghost crabs must return to the sea to release their eggs. They hatch into marine planktonic larvae.

Golden ghost crabs live in deep burrows in the intertidal and supratidal zones of open sandy beaches. Some burrows may be found as much as 12 to 20 m (39 to 66 ft) away from the high water mark and in the dune zone, but they are densest in the intertidal zone (71%). The burrows are vertically constructed, with the bottom commonly situated south of the entrance. It is believed that this is to prevent sunlight from shining into the burrow during the day.

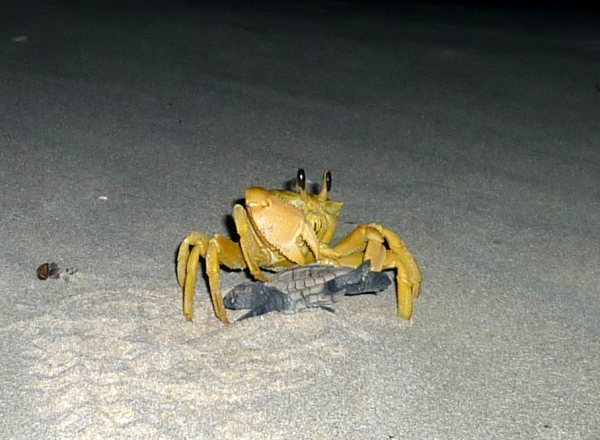
A golden ghost crab preying on a loggerhead sea turtle (Caretta caretta) hatchling at Gnaraloo, Western Australia

They are swift runners, darting away to their burrows at the slightest sign of danger. In the presence of potential threats (like humans), golden ghost crabs have been observed to only raise one eyestalk at a time, keeping the other one protected within its eye orbit. This may be to avoid having both eyes damaged in case of an attack.

Golden ghost crabs are a generalist species. They scavenge carrion and debris like dead fish or seaweed washed up by the waves; as well as prey on small animals like molluscs, other crustaceans, and sea turtle hatchlings.

=== Effects on sea turtle conservation ===
The Western Australian coast is the site of a significant number of rookeries of loggerhead sea turtles (Caretta caretta), green sea turtles (Chelonia mydas), and hawksbill sea turtles (Eretmochelys imbricata), all of which are classified Endangered to Critically Endangered. The nesting sites are particularly numerous for loggerhead sea turtles, whose rookeries from Shark Bay to Gnaraloo Bay, Ningaloo Reef, and the Cape Range National Park are some of the largest in the world. Along with the introduced red fox (Vulpes vulpes), golden ghost crabs are significant as one of the main predators of sea turtle eggs and hatchlings in these regions.

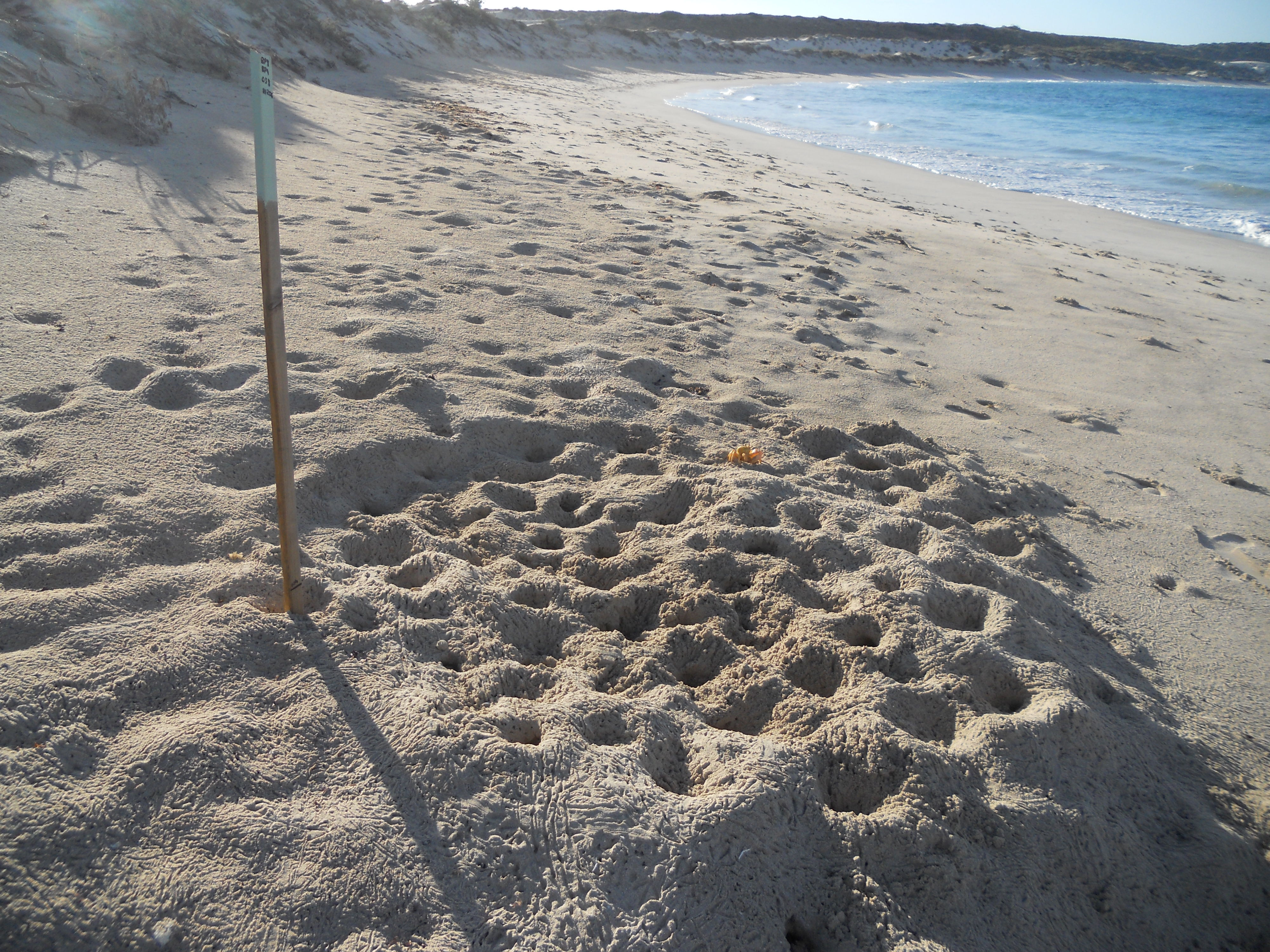
A golden ghost crab on a marked sea turtle nest

In the Gnaraloo Bay Rookery, where red fox populations have largely been kept in check, sea turtle eggs and hatchlings are mostly preyed upon by golden ghost crabs and, to a lesser extent, horned ghost crabs. Aside from directly preying on emerging hatchlings heading towards the water, there are also indications that golden ghost crabs actively burrow into nesting sites and feed on turtle eggs.

In a 2010 assessment by the Gnaraloo Turtle Conservation Program, golden ghost crabs were found to be responsible for the most number of sea turtle egg and hatchling predation. Golden ghost crabs disturbed 38% and 46.7% of the egg chambers in the total number of nests within the study area during day and night studies respectively. They were also recorded to be responsible for the predation of 12% of the total number of hatchlings that emerged. In comparison, red foxes were responsible for only 6.51% (day) and 9.5% (night) of nest disturbances, and only 0.3% of hatchling predation.

During the peak nesting season in 2010 to 2011, golden ghost crabs were also recorded to have disturbed 35% (Note: Disturbed nests refer to ghost crab burrows being found in nests but with no evidence of egg mortality visible from the surface. They may not necessarily indicate predation as some nests with ghost crab burrows were still observed to successfully hatch) of the nests and to have actively preyed upon another 38%, (Note: Nest predation refers to ghost crab burrows being found in nests with clear evidence of egg mortality visible from the surface such as egg fragments, yolk, or an exposed egg chamber) for a cumulative 73% of the nests affected.

Areas with higher numbers of turtle nests also had higher numbers of ghost crabs, indicating a possible positive correlation between the two. The ghost crab population was highest during the summer seasons, and it is hypothesised that this might be because of greater food availability, as the summer tides leave a greater amount of debris on the beaches. However, gauging the true extent of the effects of golden ghost crabs on sea turtle hatchling and egg mortality still remains difficult, largely due to the fact that they usually flee at the presence of human observers and thus skew the data. Nest monitoring with night vision cameras has been proposed as a possible means of acquiring a more accurate assessment.

Some methods for protecting the nests against golden ghost crabs have been proposed for trial in Gnaraloo. These include wire or plastic screens placed over the nests and continued human presence to discourage predators.

== Distribution ==
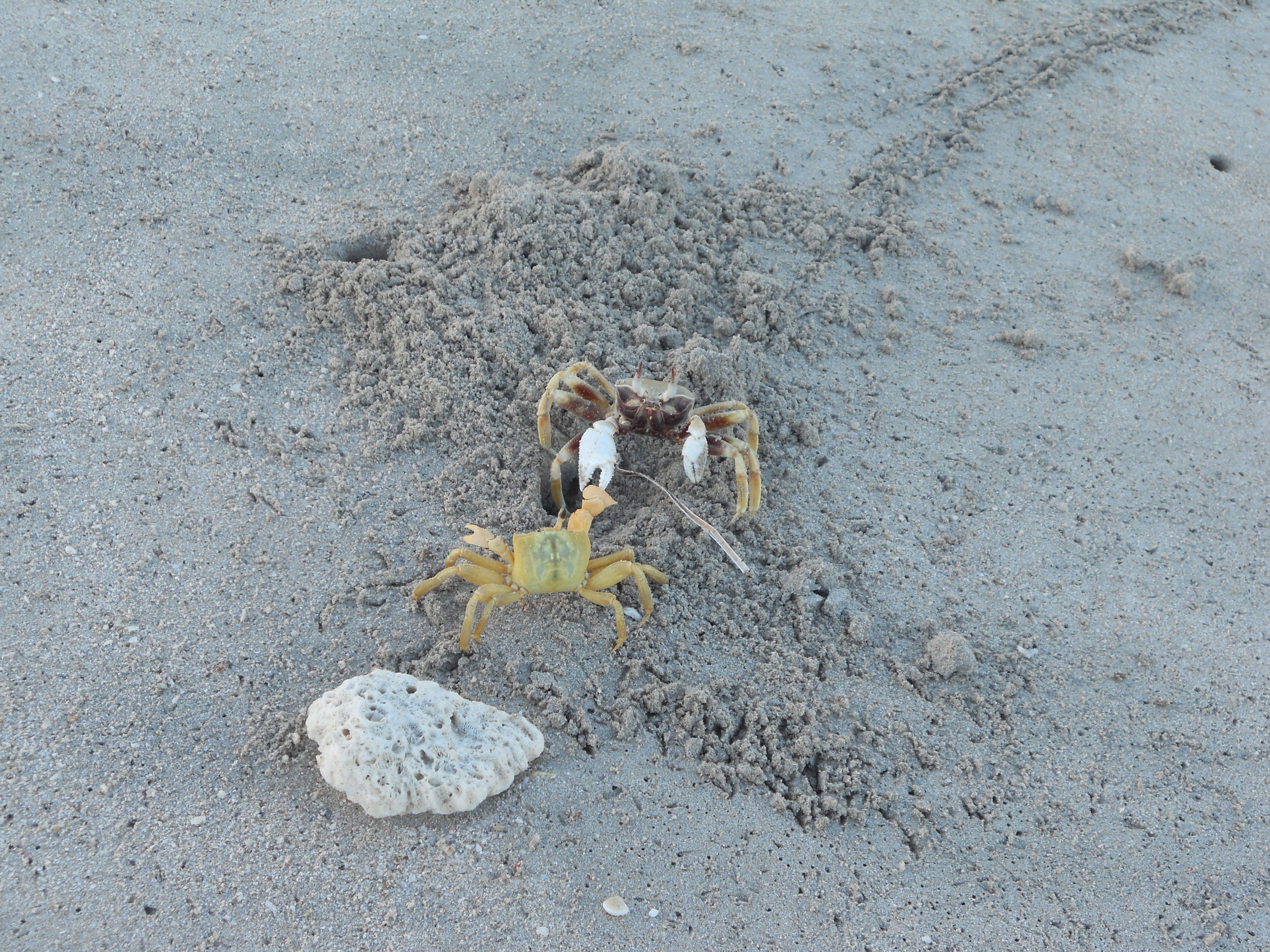
Antagonistic encounter between a golden ghost crab and a horned ghost crab (Ocypode ceratophthalma)

Golden ghost crabs are endemic to the coast of Western Australia, from Broome to Perth. They are one of five ghost crab species found in the Western Australian coast, the others being Ocypode ceratophthalma, Ocypode cordimanus, Ocypode fabricii, and Ocypode pallidula. Among these, Ocypode fabricii is also endemic to Australia (from Darwin to Shark Bay).

Golden ghost crabs can easily be distinguished from all other species by their large size, their golden yellow colouration, and the rough tuberculation on their claws. The only similarly sized species in the region is the horned ghost crab, which are also easily distinguishable as they are the only ghost crab in Australia exhibiting spikes (exophthalmy) on the tips of their eyestalks. Younger individuals may be identified through the examination of their stridulating ridges and the shape of their gonopods.

== Conservation ==
Due to the limited range of golden ghost crabs in Western Australia, they are deemed vulnerable to large scale environmental disasters that might affect the region (like oil spills).

Like other ghost crabs, they are also strongly affected by human activity on their beach habitats, particularly by vehicles. In Western Australia, where driving off-road vehicles are common recreational activities by locals and tourists, ghost crabs are often crushed inside their burrows due to the weight of the passing vehicles. This is believed to contribute to their very low populations (up to 90% lower) in beaches near the urban areas in southern Australia.

Golden ghost crabs, however, remain abundant in places with little to no human habitation, particularly in beaches with restricted vehicular access (such as the Gnaraloo Station).

== See also ==
- Threats to sea turtles
