= Exmouth Gulf =

Gulf in Western Australia

Coordinates: 22°10′S 114°18′E

Location in Western Australia

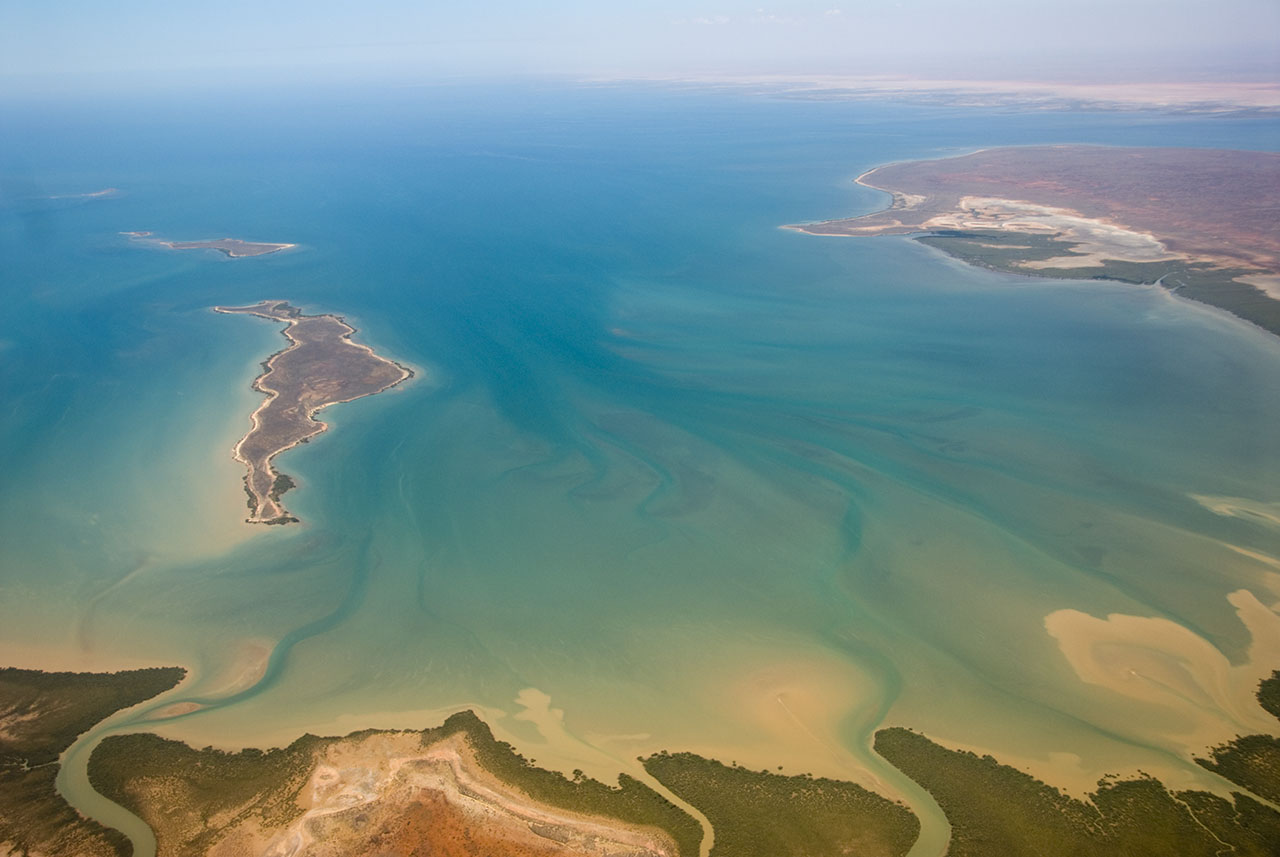
Gales Bay at the south end of Exmouth Gulf

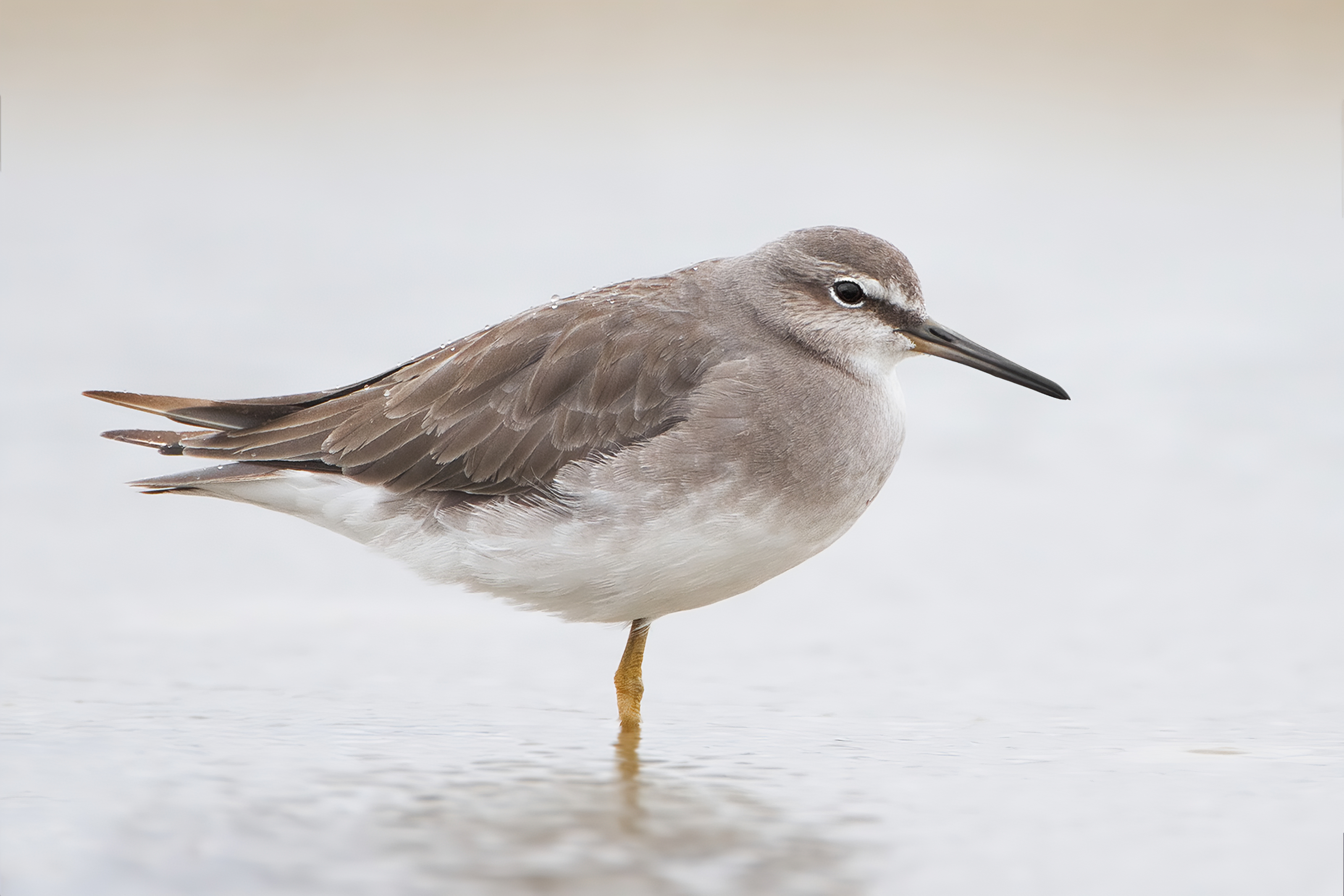
The gulf's mangroves are an important site for grey-tailed tattlers

Exmouth Gulf is a gulf in the north-west of Western Australia. It lies between North West Cape and the main coastline of Western Australia. It is considered to be part of the Pilbara Coast and Northwest Shelf, and the Carnarvon Basin geologic formation. It was named after Edward Pellew, 1st Viscount Exmouth by Phillip Parker King in 1818.

== Environment ==
Exmouth Gulf is a rich marine environment. It is a nursery for humpback whales, dugong and turtles. The mangrove systems on the eastern margins are areas of high primary productivity feeding and restocking both the Gulf and the nearby Ningaloo Reef.

A proposal for a system of solar salt evaporation ponds stretching more than 30 kilometres (19 mi) along the gulf's south-western coast has given rise to heated debate on possible environmental impacts on the area.

The Gulf and off-shore waters beyond the Ningaloo fringing reef are home to some of Australia's more significant sport fish including marlin, Spanish mackerel, and several sub-species of tuna.

The Gulf sustains one of Western Australia's largest prawn fisheries, managed by the Kailis Fishing Group, which operates under license from the Western Australian Government.

=== Birds ===
The mangroves along the eastern side of the gulf stretch for nearly 50 kilometres (31 mi). They have been identified by BirdLife International as a 420 square kilometres (160 sq mi) Important Bird Area (IBA) because they support over 1% of the world populations of pied oystercatchers and grey-tailed tattlers, as well as being an important site for the restricted-range dusky gerygone. Another IBA is 11 hectares (27 acres) Sunday Island, lying in the north of the Gulf near the Muiron Islands, which is an important nesting site for roseate terns.

== See also ==
- Exmouth Submarine Base
