= GWF =

GWF may refer to:

- George Weston Foods, an Australian food products company
- German Wrestling Federation, a German professional wrestling promotion
- Global Water Foundation
- Global Wrestling Federation, an American professional wrestling promotion
- Gnaraloo Wilderness Foundation
- Gothaer Waggonfabrik, a defunct German aircraft and rolling stock manufacturer
- Gowro language, native to Pakistan
- Guild Wars Factions, a video game
