= List of homesteads in Western Australia: G =

This list includes all homesteads in Western Australia with a gazetted name. It is complete with respect to the 1996 Gazetteer of Australia. Dubious names have been checked against the online 2004 data, and in all cases confirmed correct. However, if any homesteads have been gazetted or deleted since 1996, this list does not reflect these changes. Strictly speaking, Australian place names are gazetted in capital letters only; the names in this list have been converted to mixed case in accordance with normal capitalisation conventions.

Name	Location	Remarks
Gabatepe	33°32′S 117°23′E	
Gabbyquoiquoi	31°2′S 116°50′E	
Gabyinda	33°42′S 117°6′E	
Gabyon	28°15′S 116°21′E	
Gadara	34°23′S 119°9′E	
Gadara	29°8′S 114°54′E	
Gairdner	34°13′S 119°4′E	
Gale Hill	33°56′S 115°48′E	
Galil	34°34′S 118°24′E	
Galyn	33°40′S 115°9′E	
Gamerigg	34°35′S 117°32′E	
Gandergobbler	33°47′S 117°45′E	
Gannawarra	33°40′S 117°26′E	
Ganya	33°15′S 115°46′E	
Garden Valley	33°38′S 117°31′E	
Garinga	34°20′S 117°28′E	
Garthowan	33°43′S 117°5′E	
Gaylands	33°54′S 118°28′E	
Gaythorne	34°24′S 116°8′E	
Gee Gie Outcamp	27°21′S 114°8′E	
Geebin	32°35′S 117°0′E	
Geekabee Downs	34°19′S 117°25′E	
Gefn	32°16′S 118°11′E	
Gembira	29°9′S 114°54′E	
Genarling	32°28′S 117°43′E	
Geodlin	32°27′S 117°59′E	
Geovon	33°41′S 122°31′E	
Geraldine	29°13′S 115°17′E	
Gerbryn	33°48′S 122°14′E	
Gerby	33°48′S 122°15′E	
Gevalwin	34°30′S 116°57′E	
Ghezireh	33°13′S 115°49′E	
Ghirrawheen	33°41′S 117°49′E	
Gibb River	16°26′S 126°26′E	
Gibb Rock	32°5′S 119°6′E	
Gidgea Outcamp	24°58′S 114°22′E	
Gidgee	27°15′S 119°24′E	
Gidgelbarrup	33°37′S 117°53′E	
Gidgie	34°2′S 118°6′E	
Gifford Creek	24°3′S 116°13′E	
Gilgering	32°2′S 116°48′E	
Gillespie	34°2′S 115°9′E	
Gillimanning	32°39′S 117°25′E	
Gilroyd	25°49′S 115°11′E	
Gimlet Park	29°30′S 115°57′E	
Gimlet Park	31°30′S 118°23′E	
Ginara	31°20′S 115°51′E	
Ginawarra	29°41′S 116°2′E	
Ginawarra	29°9′S 115°5′E	
Gindalbie	30°17′S 121°45′E	
Giralia	22°41′S 114°22′E	
Giraween	33°47′S 118°7′E	
Girraween	30°34′S 115°49′E	
Girraween	33°38′S 119°22′E	
Girraween	34°6′S 116°57′E	
Girrawheen	34°57′S 117°28′E	
Glainorie	34°15′S 118°4′E	
Glanville	34°4′S 117°32′E	
Glen	27°3′S 117°34′E	
Glen Aire	33°52′S 115°10′E	
Glen Albyn	33°31′S 115°32′E	
Glen Allen	34°2′S 118°9′E	
Glen Almond	33°57′S 117°53′E	
Glen Alvon	33°16′S 117°27′E	
Glen Avon	31°42′S 116°32′E	
Glen Avon	31°37′S 116°32′E	
Glen Avon	30°49′S 116°51′E	
Glen Avon	33°11′S 115°51′E	
Glen Beigh	34°31′S 117°6′E	
Glen Candy	34°57′S 117°59′E	
Glen Darran	31°38′S 116°7′E	
Glen Devon	33°45′S 116°37′E	
Glen Dunley	33°51′S 115°58′E	
Glen Echo	34°56′S 117°59′E	
Glen Ellen	34°22′S 118°24′E	
Glen Ervine	32°0′S 116°50′E	
Glen Florrie	22°56′S 115°59′E	
Glen Florrie Homestead	22°56′S 115°59′E	
Glen Hill	16°33′S 128°21′E	
Glen Idle	34°16′S 119°25′E	
Glen Innes	33°33′S 117°28′E	
Glen Innes	29°3′S 116°1′E	
Glen Iris	32°24′S 117°4′E	
Glen Irwin	31°59′S 116°51′E	
Glen Isla	33°38′S 121°16′E	
Glen Karaleda	32°11′S 116°53′E	
Glen Karaleea	33°33′S 115°50′E	
Glen Karri	34°5′S 115°6′E	
Glen Maureena	33°45′S 121°17′E	
Glen Morrel	32°29′S 117°27′E	
Glen Oaklands	34°4′S 117°2′E	
Glen Omrah	32°48′S 118°1′E	
Glen Onie	34°38′S 117°45′E	
Glen Raven	33°39′S 119°47′E	
Glen Robin	33°7′S 117°35′E	
Glen Ruff	30°36′S 115°54′E	
Glen Turret	34°12′S 118°12′E	
Glen Valley	33°47′S 121°34′E	
Glen Valley	32°24′S 116°41′E	
Glen View	34°13′S 115°10′E	
Glen Waddi	29°54′S 116°11′E	
Glen-ayle	25°16′S 122°3′E	
Glen-burnie	29°56′S 115°24′E	
Glenalan	31°13′S 116°11′E	
Glenalbyn	33°31′S 115°32′E	
Glenalbyn	33°44′S 117°30′E	
Glenalta	33°39′S 115°59′E	
Glenarchy	34°25′S 116°49′E	
Glenbourne	33°55′S 115°1′E	
Glenbrook	33°26′S 115°45′E	
Glenbrook	33°26′S 116°52′E	
Glenbrook	31°13′S 116°23′E	
Glenburgh	25°26′S 116°7′E	
Glenburn	34°29′S 117°2′E	
Glenburn	33°27′S 117°3′E	
Glenburnie	32°28′S 117°50′E	
Glenburnie	33°7′S 115°52′E	
Glenburnie	28°45′S 114°52′E	
Glencoe	31°17′S 115°46′E	
Glencoe	33°38′S 115°58′E	
Glencoe	31°13′S 116°14′E	
Glencoe	34°37′S 117°38′E	
Glencoe	32°34′S 116°57′E	
Glencoe	33°56′S 117°59′E	
Glencoe	33°37′S 123°52′E	Ruin
Glenculter	33°1′S 119°52′E	
Glendale	33°55′S 117°12′E	
Glendale	32°35′S 117°8′E	
Glendale	31°39′S 116°2′E	
Glendale	33°57′S 116°28′E	
Glendale Farm	34°1′S 119°1′E	
Glendale Farm	33°43′S 115°4′E	
Glenders	31°28′S 116°37′E	
Glendew	31°30′S 116°5′E	
Glendor	33°31′S 117°41′E	
Glendower	33°11′S 117°24′E	
Gleneden	33°40′S 115°35′E	
Glenelg	34°18′S 118°17′E	
Glenelg	33°40′S 116°36′E	
Glenelg	33°37′S 117°48′E	
Glenelg	33°45′S 117°1′E	
Glenelg	33°49′S 117°0′E	
Glenellerup	34°31′S 117°3′E	
Glenercott	33°56′S 117°34′E	
Glenern	33°11′S 119°6′E	
Glenerne	32°32′S 116°56′E	
Glenewin	32°1′S 116°58′E	
Gleneyle	34°0′S 115°2′E	
Glenfern	33°34′S 117°48′E	
Glenfillan	34°7′S 116°48′E	
Glenford	33°58′S 116°4′E	
Glengarie	33°28′S 116°40′E	
Glengarry	33°48′S 117°43′E	
Glengarry	28°50′S 114°49′E	
Glengarry	34°0′S 117°59′E	
Glengary	33°58′S 115°6′E	
Glengower	31°35′S 116°6′E	
Glengowrie	32°22′S 116°50′E	
Glengrye	33°40′S 115°55′E	
Glengyle	29°42′S 116°12′E	
Glenhilly	33°14′S 116°58′E	
Glenhuon	33°18′S 115°43′E	
Glenhurst	32°11′S 118°13′E	
Glenidol	33°22′S 118°30′E	
Glenisla	34°4′S 118°11′E	
Glenistra	33°50′S 117°0′E	
Glenkeith	33°51′S 116°48′E	
Glenlark	30°39′S 115°45′E	
Glenlea	33°45′S 117°37′E	
Glenlee	32°3′S 118°15′E	
Glenlee	31°41′S 118°14′E	
Glenleigh	34°15′S 115°9′E	
Glenlossie	33°49′S 117°9′E	
Glenloth Park	29°54′S 116°12′E	
Glenluce	33°50′S 115°4′E	
Glenmaurie	33°39′S 121°47′E	
Glenmere	34°41′S 117°23′E	
Glenmohr	32°32′S 118°10′E	
Glenmore	29°40′S 116°16′E	
Glenmore	32°27′S 117°25′E	
Glenmore	32°14′S 117°39′E	
Glenmore Park	32°14′S 117°43′E	
Glennlossy	34°3′S 119°22′E	
Glennoye	33°15′S 116°47′E	
Glenoban	31°52′S 116°41′E	
Glenone	33°33′S 115°2′E	
Glenora	34°8′S 117°32′E	
Glenorchy	33°3′S 116°58′E	
Glenorchy	33°38′S 116°44′E	
Glenorchy	33°53′S 118°5′E	
Glenore	33°13′S 116°47′E	
Glenorn	29°5′S 121°40′E	
Glenoyle	33°37′S 115°53′E	
Glenpadden	34°0′S 117°13′E	
Glenrae	31°27′S 116°49′E	
Glenray	32°52′S 117°46′E	
Glenroa	34°0′S 115°7′E	
Glenronnie	32°15′S 116°54′E	
Glenrowan	33°46′S 117°24′E	
Glenrowan	34°12′S 117°3′E	
Glenrowan	33°17′S 117°43′E	
Glenrowan	31°58′S 116°53′E	
Glenrowan	31°22′S 116°29′E	
Glenroy	17°22′S 126°6′E	
Glenroy	33°50′S 117°3′E	
Glenroy	33°56′S 117°58′E	
Glenshee	33°24′S 117°51′E	
Glenside	31°20′S 116°40′E	
Glentana	33°5′S 115°57′E	
Glentor	34°39′S 117°52′E	
Glentromie	30°55′S 116°14′E	
Glenumbral	33°38′S 122°24′E	
Glenvalley Farm	33°41′S 115°1′E	
Glenvar	30°48′S 116°53′E	
Glenview	33°45′S 116°22′E	
Glenview	31°25′S 116°49′E	
Glenwest	34°29′S 118°37′E	
Glenyon	33°39′S 116°43′E	
Glevedon	32°31′S 118°12′E	
Gloverdale	33°38′S 115°35′E	
Glynde	31°42′S 116°44′E	
Glynmar Farms	33°22′S 116°19′E	
Gna-we	33°53′S 117°22′E	
Gnamagun	34°17′S 117°35′E	
Gnamma Valley	33°40′S 121°57′E	
Gnaraloo	23°49′S 113°31′E	
Gnarawary	34°0′S 115°4′E	
Gnoolowa	28°56′S 115°28′E	
Gobabua	32°57′S 116°47′E	
Gogo	18°18′S 125°35′E	
Golden Acres	33°44′S 119°15′E	
Golden Grove	33°13′S 117°3′E	
Golden Grove	32°18′S 116°49′E	
Golden Grove	31°36′S 116°7′E	
Golden Grove	33°6′S 115°56′E	
Golden Heights	33°12′S 115°43′E	
Golden Park	34°19′S 118°59′E	
Golden Valley	33°4′S 117°52′E	
Golden Valley	32°19′S 116°55′E	
Golden Valley	33°56′S 117°25′E	
Golden View	32°12′S 117°8′E	
Golden West	29°32′S 115°55′E	
Goldmead	33°29′S 116°44′E	
Good Hills	33°50′S 115°48′E	
Good Wood Park	33°39′S 115°44′E	
Goodingnow	29°23′S 117°42′E	
Goodwell Farm	31°18′S 115°52′E	
Googlegong	34°33′S 118°18′E	
Goon Gooning	31°20′S 116°43′E	
Goonac	33°41′S 116°9′E	
Goongarrie	29°59′S 121°3′E	
Goose Hill	15°34′S 128°20′E	
Gordon Downs	18°45′S 128°35′E	
Gordon River	34°17′S 117°30′E	
Gorey	33°46′S 121°7′E	
Gorya	33°48′S 121°49′E	
Gorya Downs	33°29′S 122°6′E	
Goyamin Pools	31°33′S 116°9′E	
Goyarra	28°32′S 115°5′E	
Graball	32°3′S 118°34′E	
Gracefield	34°6′S 117°20′E	
Gracefield	33°44′S 117°38′E	
Gracemere Park	30°26′S 116°7′E	
Grafton	34°10′S 117°51′E	
Graham Outcamp	24°43′S 114°20′E	
Grand View	33°40′S 117°24′E	
Granite Hills	33°50′S 115°47′E	
Granite Peak	25°38′S 121°22′E	
Granville	31°13′S 116°48′E	
Grasfeld	34°32′S 118°33′E	
Grasmere	33°38′S 117°52′E	
Grass Vale	33°10′S 116°47′E	
Grass Valley	33°30′S 115°50′E	
Grassdale	32°53′S 116°28′E	
Grassdale	33°11′S 117°57′E	
Grassdale	31°55′S 116°47′E	
Grassdale	32°41′S 116°41′E	
Grassdale	32°21′S 116°44′E	
Grassmor	29°53′S 115°24′E	
Grasswood	33°43′S 115°49′E	
Graydon	34°27′S 117°14′E	
Green Grove	29°32′S 115°4′E	
Green Grove Valley	29°33′S 115°4′E	
Green Hill	33°2′S 116°29′E	
Green Stone	33°23′S 119°24′E	
Green Valley	33°1′S 116°27′E	
Green Valley	34°11′S 115°8′E	
Green Warri	34°43′S 118°30′E	
Greenacres	31°18′S 115°36′E	
Greenacres	34°51′S 118°9′E	
Greenacres	33°41′S 121°50′E	
Greenacres	33°18′S 117°5′E	
Greenfields	33°30′S 115°34′E	
Greenfields	33°15′S 115°47′E	
Greenhaven	34°38′S 116°10′E	
Greenhills	31°34′S 116°26′E	
Greenhills	31°38′S 116°2′E	
Greenhills	33°47′S 117°35′E	
Greenlands	28°49′S 115°1′E	
Greenslopes	31°40′S 116°5′E	
Greenvale	34°59′S 117°33′E	
Greenvale	34°27′S 117°26′E	
Greenvale	17°5′S 127°50′E	
Greenville	32°51′S 117°20′E	
Greenway Park	30°52′S 116°15′E	
Greenwood	31°14′S 115°34′E	
Greenwood	33°40′S 115°35′E	
Greenwood Farm	34°4′S 117°30′E	
Greenwood Outcamp	26°22′S 118°44′E	
Greve-lea	33°47′S 116°32′E	
Greycliffe	33°19′S 115°51′E	
Greycotes Farm	34°57′S 117°33′E	
Greystone	33°36′S 117°33′E	
Greystones	33°6′S 116°41′E	
Greystones	34°33′S 117°37′E	
Griffiths	30°55′S 115°53′E	
Gripthorpe	31°14′S 116°35′E	
Guayula Park	33°18′S 121°29′E	
Gum Flats	33°40′S 117°39′E	
Gummeracka	32°41′S 118°15′E	
Gunbower	33°20′S 117°53′E	
Gundagai	33°34′S 115°40′E	
Gundarup	33°49′S 115°48′E	
Gungunnu	32°54′S 118°30′E	
Gungunnu Downs	33°28′S 121°19′E	
Gunine	31°24′S 116°51′E	
Gunna Do	33°51′S 119°12′E	
Gunna Do	33°40′S 119°20′E	
Gunna Tri	33°17′S 119°57′E	
Gunnadorrah	30°59′S 125°52′E	
Gunwarrie	34°19′S 117°13′E	
Gunyidi	30°10′S 116°6′E	
Guyscliffe	29°55′S 116°27′E	
Gwambygine	31°59′S 116°48′E	
Gwen Dale	33°1′S 116°39′E	
Gwindinup	33°31′S 115°45′E	
Gymcoorda	32°39′S 116°32′E	

== See also ==
- List of pastoral leases in Western Australia
