= Sunday Island (Exmouth Gulf) =

Island in the Exmouth Gulf, Australia

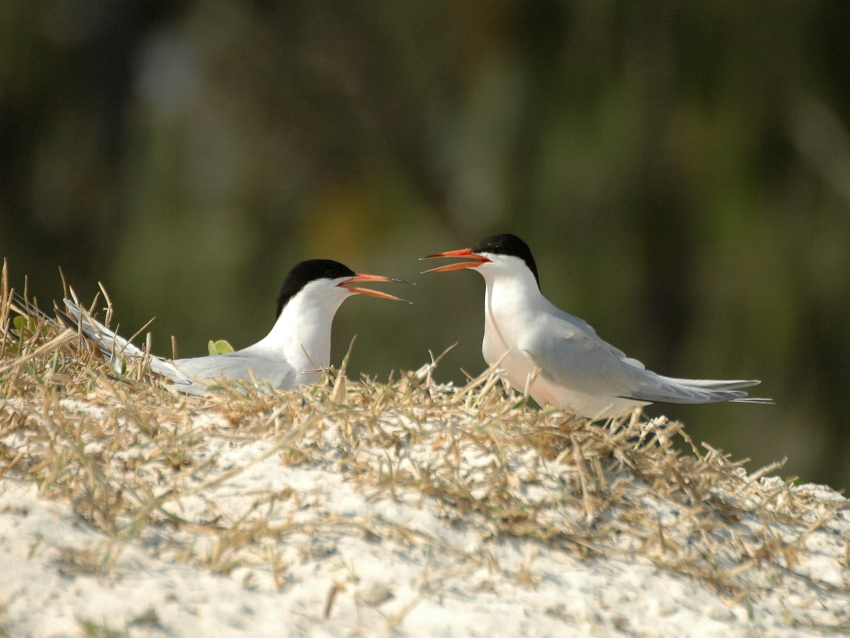
- The island is an important nesting site for roseate terns

Geography
- Coordinates: 21°42′17″S 114°25′08″E

Administration
- Australia

Sunday Island is a small island, lying about 15 km south-east of the Muiron Islands, in the Exmouth Gulf of north-western Australia.

== Description ==
Sunday is a low, sand and limestone, 11 ha island vegetated mainly with beach spinifex, pigface and low shrubs. Other recorded plants include large pigweed, caperbush, limestone wattle and goat's foot. The average annual rainfall is about 300 mm. The island's high conservation value is recognised by its inclusion in the Muiron Islands Marine Management Area.

== Birds ==
The island has been identified as an Important Bird Area by BirdLife International because it supported about 2000 breeding pairs of roseate terns, well over 1% of the world population, when it was surveyed in 1997.
