= Gnaraloo Turtle Conservation Program =

Environmental organization

Gnaraloo Turtle Conservation Program (GTCP)
- Founded: 2005
- Type: Non-governmental organization
- Purpose: Conservation and research
- Location: Gnaraloo, Western Australia
- Website: gnaraloo.org and GTCP Facebook page

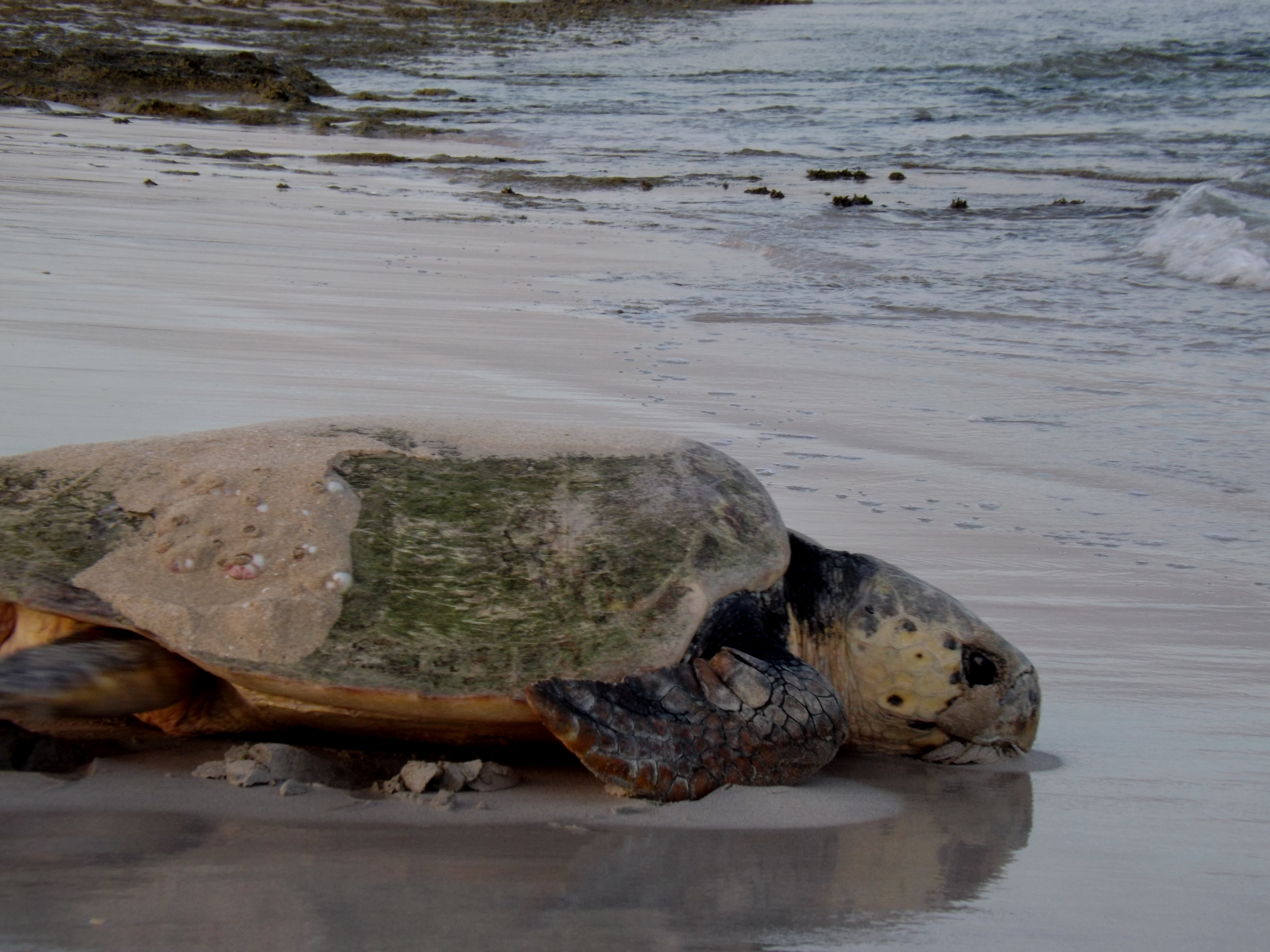
A loggerhead sea turtle returning to sea after nesting in the Gnaraloo Bay Rookery

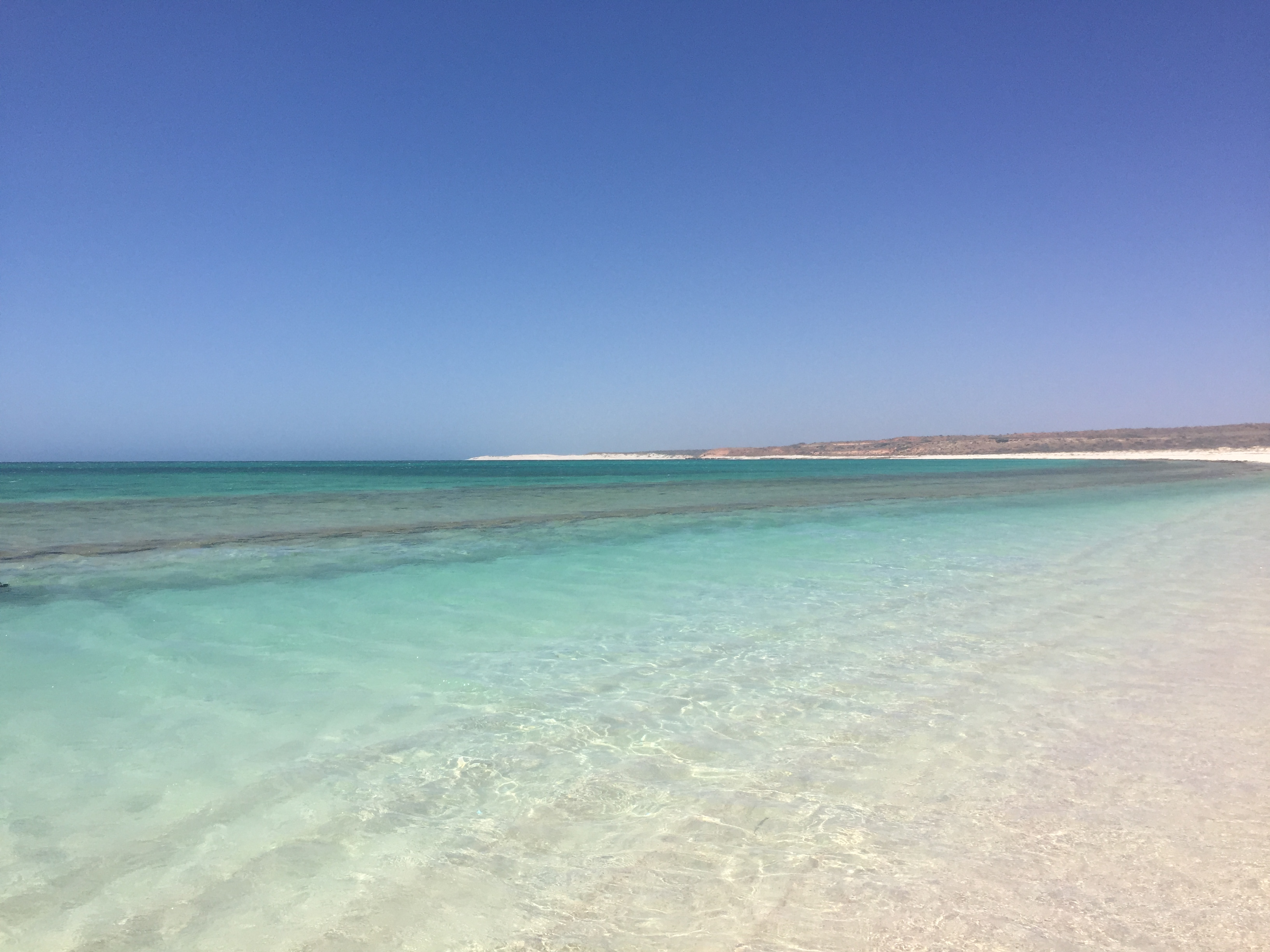
Gnaraloo Bay

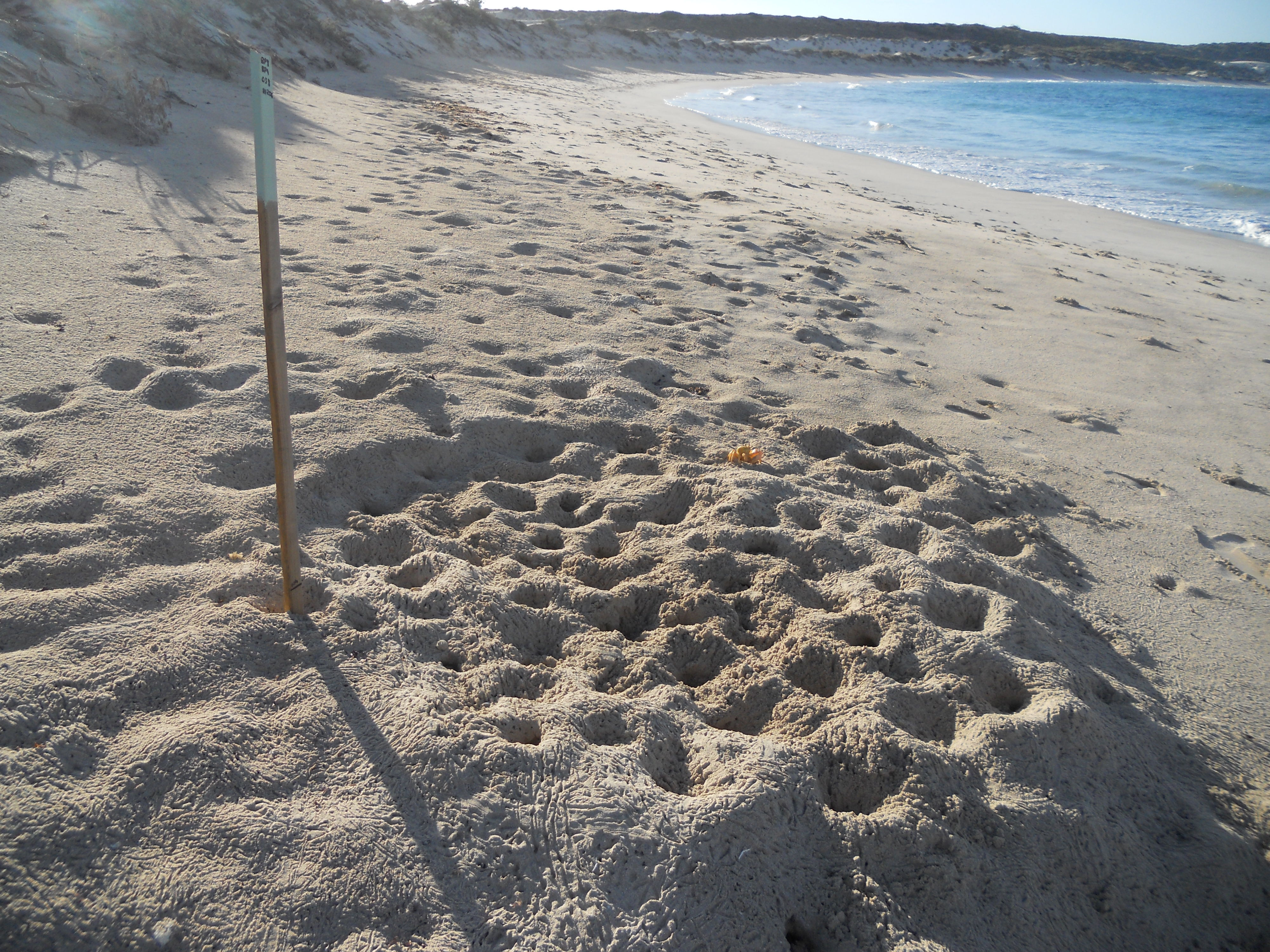
Sampled nest monitored by GTCP field team throughout incubation

The Gnaraloo Turtle Conservation Program (GTCP) is an environmental organisation based at the Gnaraloo pastoral station and run by the Gnaraloo Wilderness Foundation, a not-for-profit organisation. The aim of the GTCP is to identify, monitor and protect the nesting beaches of loggerhead sea turtles (Caretta caretta) found at two locations on the Gnaraloo coastline. These two rookeries contribute to the South-East Indian Ocean subpopulation of loggerhead turtles, with other major nesting sites for this sub-population at Dirk Hartog island (within Shark Bay) and Exmouth. This is within the southern boundaries of the Ningaloo Coast marine area, a UNESCO World Heritage Site.

== History ==
The Western Australian coast is the site of a significant number of rookeries of loggerhead sea turtles (Caretta caretta), green sea turtles (Chelonia mydas), and hawksbill sea turtles (Eretmochelys imbricata), all of which are classified vulnerable to critically endangered on the IUCN Red List of Threatened Species. The nesting sites are particularly numerous for loggerhead sea turtles, whose rookeries range from Shark Bay to Gnaraloo Bay in the south, and Ningaloo Reef to the Cape Range National Park in the north.

In 2005, after purchasing the land at Gnaraloo, the Gnaraloo Station Trust became aware of the threatened population of sea turtles nesting along the coast and recognized the need for their protection and conservation. An on-ground monitoring and scientific research program was established with the help of the Department of Environment and Conservation (DEC) (now DPaW), following a similar protocol to the neighbouring Ningaloo Turtle Program in Exmouth. Full season surveys of sea turtle tracks and nests within the Gnaraloo Bay Rookery (1 November - 28 February) have taken place since 2008.

Yearly, a successful and in depth community engagement program has been undertaken, visiting schools along the Western Australian coast from Carnarvon to Busselton.

In late 2015, the Gnaraloo Wilderness Foundation was created in order to facilitate the environmental conservation efforts of Gnaraloo; it received its not-for-profit incorporated association status in Western Australia on 12 January 2016.

== Gnaraloo Feral Animal Control Program ==
The Gnaraloo Turtle Conservation Program operates in conjunction with the Gnaraloo Feral Animal Control Program, which was implemented in 2009 with the aim of reducing the impact of feral animals, namely the introduced European red fox (Vulpes vulpes), as well as feral cats and wild dogs. Since the 2010/2011 season, feral predation has been successfully maintained at 0%, providing complete protection of sea turtle eggs and hatchlings from these feral predators.

== Ghost crab predation ==
The endemic golden ghost crabs (Ocypode convexa) and, to a lesser extent, horned ghost crabs (Ocypode ceratopthalmus) are also significant as some of the main predators of sea turtle eggs and hatchlings in Western Australia. Some methods for protecting the nests against ghost crabs have been proposed for trial in Gnaraloo, including wire or plastic screens placed over the nests.

== See also ==
- Threats to sea turtles
