= Mauds Landing =

Beach in Western Australia

Coordinates: 23°06′51″S 113°46′34″E

Mauds Landing is a historic beach located approximately 3 kilometres (1.9 mi) north of Coral Bay, Western Australia. The site was initially intended as a port for wool and livestock transportation. Presently, it stands as a vital nesting site for Green and Loggerhead turtles, with remnants of its past still evident along the coastline.

== Description ==
Mauds Landing, initially a historical settlement site, is a beach located within Coral Bay, Western Australia. The beach spans approximately 8.5 kilometres (5.3 mi), starting from the point of the bay and curving gently northeastward before concluding near Oyster Bridge, where a 200-metre (660 ft) beachrock reef marks its end. The shoreline predominantly faces north to north-east and is sheltered by an offshore reef, resulting in generally calm, reflective conditions along most of its stretch, with wave heights typically averaging under 0.5 metres (1 ft 8 in).

== History ==
Mauds Landing was established as a town site reserve in 1896 after the arrival of the schooner Maud, whose captain identified the area. A substantial jetty, extending 450 metres (1,480 ft) into the sea with a 30-metre-long (98 ft) and 6-metre-wide (20 ft) T-head (a pier with a perpendicular extension forming a T shape), was constructed along with more infrastructure including a tramway, a well, and a woolshed. The port served as a pivotal shipping point for wool, sheep, and cattle until the late 1940s. However, shipping activities ceased in 1947, leading to the dismantling of the jetty and subsequent relocation of the structure by the Northwest Whaling Company to Norwegian Bay, 85 kilometers north of its original location.

From 1968 onwards, a competing settlement emerged southwards at Bills Bay, featuring a hotel, caravan park, and service station, eventually developing into the present-day Coral Bay. Despite Mauds Landing's historical significance and multiple proposed developmental initiatives, including oil exploration, fish processing, and jetty construction, none materialized, and by 1969, new town site boundaries were established, incorporating parts of the original site into Cardabia Station's lease.

Remnants of Mauds Landing include weathered remains such as protruding jetty piles and remnants of the old wool shed.

== Environmental Significance ==
Presently, Mauds Landing serves as a crucial nesting ground for endangered Green and Loggerhead turtles. The beach remains a sacred area for many locals of Coral Bay due to its significance as a major turtle nesting site. Nesting season for turtles occurs between December and March, during which visitors are advised to maintain a minimum distance of 15 metres (49 ft) from the turtles and refrain from using torches or flash photography near them. Besides turtle nesting, the area is renowned for excellent beach fishing, especially accessible to 4WD vehicles.
