= Ningaloo Coast =

World Heritage Site and coral reef in Western Australia

UNESCO World Heritage Site
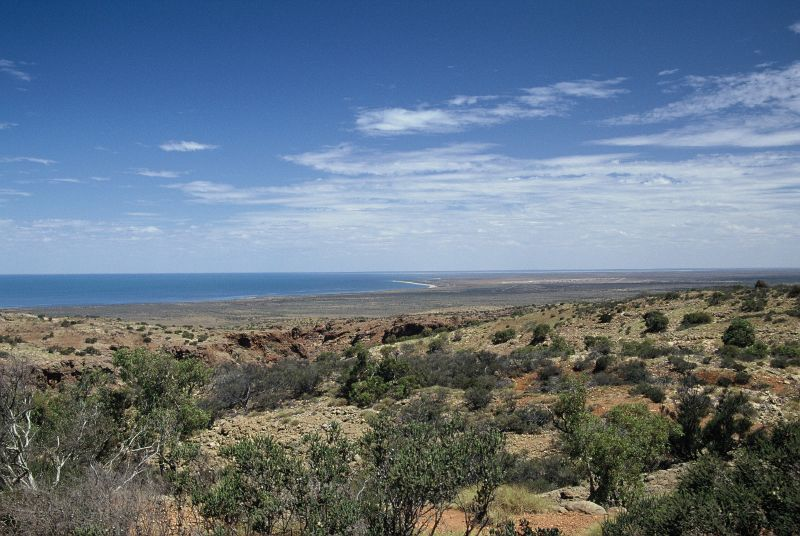

- Location within Western Australia
- Location: Western Australia, Australia
- Criteria: Natural: (vii), (x)
- Reference: 1369
- Inscription: 2011 (35th Session)
- Area: 705,015 ha (1,742,130 acres)
- Coordinates: 22°33′45″S 113°48′37″E

The Ningaloo Coast is a World Heritage Site located in the north west coastal region of Western Australia. The 705,015-hectare (1,742,130-acre) heritage-listed area is located approximately 1,200 kilometres (750 mi) north of Perth, along the East Indian Ocean. The distinctive Ningaloo Reef that fringes the Ningaloo Coast is 260 kilometres (160 mi) long and is Australia's largest fringing coral reef and the only large reef positioned very close to a landmass. The Muiron Islands and Cape Farquhar are within this coastal zone.

The reef attracts 200,000 tourists each year. In 2011 and 2025, the reef was hit by bleaching events caused by marine heatwaves.

== History ==
The coast and reef draw their name from the Wajarri language word ningaloo, meaning "promontory", "deep water", or "high land jutting into the sea". The Yamatji peoples of the Baiyungu and Yinigudura are the traditional owners of the area.

The World Heritage status of the region was created and negotiated in 2011, and the adopted boundary included the Ningaloo Marine Park (Commonwealth waters), Ningaloo Marine Park (State waters) and Muiron Islands Marine Management Area (including the Muiron Islands), Jurabi Coastal Park, Bundegi Coastal Park, Cape Range National Park, and the Learmonth Air Weapons Range. The site was gazetted on the Australian National Heritage List on 6 January 2010 under the Environment Protection and Biodiversity Conservation Act 1999.

In 1987, the reef and surrounding waters were designated as the Ningaloo Marine Park.

During the early 2000s, significant controversy arose over the proposed construction of a resort at Mauds Landing, a crucial nesting ground for the loggerhead turtle. It was also feared that the resort would be generally degrading to the entire marine park. Author Tim Winton, who lives in the area, was vocal in his opposition to the development. In 2002, when he won the WA Premier's Book Award, he donated the A$25,000 prize money, equivalent to A$41,412 in 2022, to the community campaign to save the reef. Ultimately the planned resort did not go ahead.

In 2011 and 2025, the reef was hit by bleaching events caused by marine heatwaves.

== Description ==
The World Heritage Site covers 7,050 square kilometres (2,722 mi^{2}), and is located approximately 1,200 kilometres (750 mi) north of Perth, in the East Indian Ocean. The 260-kilometre-long (160 mi) Ningaloo Reef that fringes the Ningaloo Coast is Australia's largest fringing coral reef, and the only large reef positioned very close to a landmass. The Muiron Islands and Cape Farquhar are within this coastal zone.

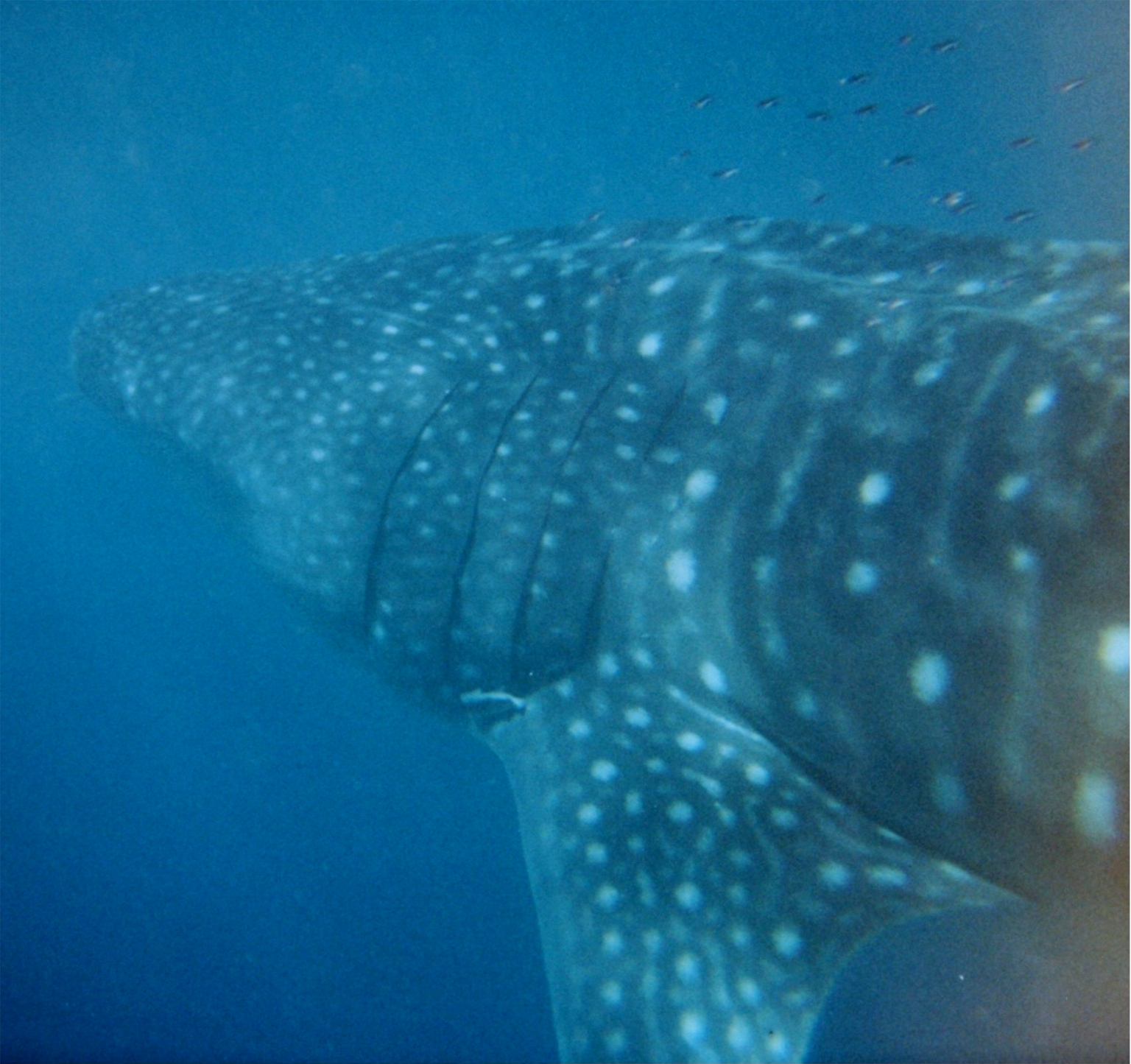
Whale shark at the reef

Although most famed for its whale sharks which feed there during March to August, the reef is also rich in coral and other marine life. During the winter months, the reef is part of the migratory routes for dolphins, dugongs, manta rays and humpback whales. The beaches of the reef are an important breeding ground of the loggerhead, green and hawksbill turtles. They also depend on the reef for nesting and food. The Ningaloo supports an abundance of fish (500 species), corals (300 species), molluscs (600 species) and many other marine invertebrates.

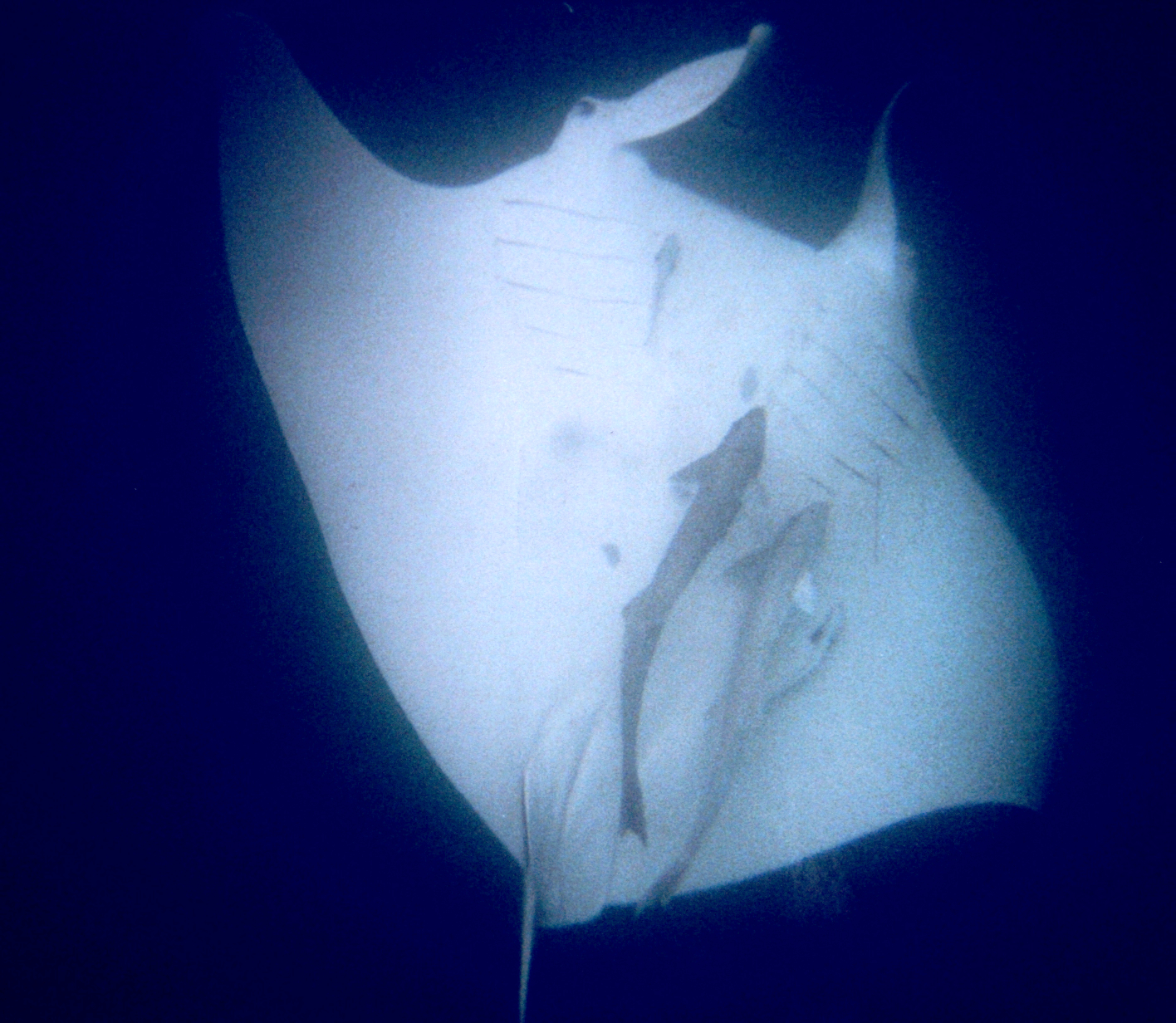
Manta ray with remoras at Ningaloo Reef

The reef is less than 500 metres (1,600 ft) offshore in some areas, such as Coral Bay. In 2006, researchers from the Australian Institute of Marine Science discovered gardens of sponges in the marine park's deeper waters that are thought to be species completely new to science. The short-nosed sea snake, thought to have been extinct for 17 years, was found on Ningaloo Reef in December 2015.

As of 2025, it was estimated that the reef attracts 200,000 tourists each year.

== In media ==
In 2023, ABC Television released a three-part documentary series called Ningaloo Nyinggulu, about the reef. The series was written and narrated by author and environmentalist Tim Winton, was nominated for an AACTA Award for Best Documentary or Factual Program, and won Innovation Award for Television in the Western Australia Screen Culture Awards.

== Ningaloo Collaborative Research Cluster ==
The Ningaloo Collaboration Cluster, an extensive research initiative commenced in 2006 and concluded in 2011 within the region, formed a vital part of the CSIRO flagship Collaboration Fund Research Initiative. The project involved researchers from the CSIRO, Sustainable Tourism Cooperative Research Centre and a range of Australian Universities including Curtin University of Technology, Murdoch University, the University of Western Australia, Australian National University and the University of Queensland. The project aimed to create a dynamic model of Ningaloo that integrated socioeconomic factors and environmental impacts resulting from human activities in the region. This model was to be combined with an ecological model of the area, ultimately serving to develop planning tools and management models. The primary goal was to facilitate sustainable utilization of the region's resources.

== Specific reserved areas ==
=== National parks and reserves in the World Heritage Area ===
- Bundegi Coastal Park
- Cape Range National Park
- Jurabi Coastal Park
- Ningaloo Marine Park (Commonwealth waters)
- Ningaloo Marine Park (State waters)

=== Islands of the World Heritage area ===
- North Muiron Island
- South Muiron Island

=== Marine Park zones ===
- Bundegi Sanctuary Zone
- Murat Sanctuary Zone
- Lighthouse Bay Sanctuary Zone
- Jurabi Sanctuary Zone
- Tantabiddi Sanctuary Zone
- Mangrove Sanctuary Zone
- Lakeside Sanctuary Zone
- Mandu Sanctuary Zone
- Osprey Sanctuary Zone
- Winderabandi Sanctuary Zone
- Cloates Sanctuary Zone
- Bateman Sanctuary Zone
- Maud Sanctuary Zone
- Pelican Sanctuary Zone
- Cape Farquhar Sanctuary Zone
- Gnaraloo Bay Sanctuary Zone
- 3 Mile Sanctuary Zone
- Turtles Sanctuary Zone
- South Muiron Conservation Area
- North Muiron Conservation Area
- Sunday Island Conservation Area

== Coastal forecast area ==
Ningaloo Coast is a designated weather forecast area, by the Bureau of Meteorology.

== Gallery ==
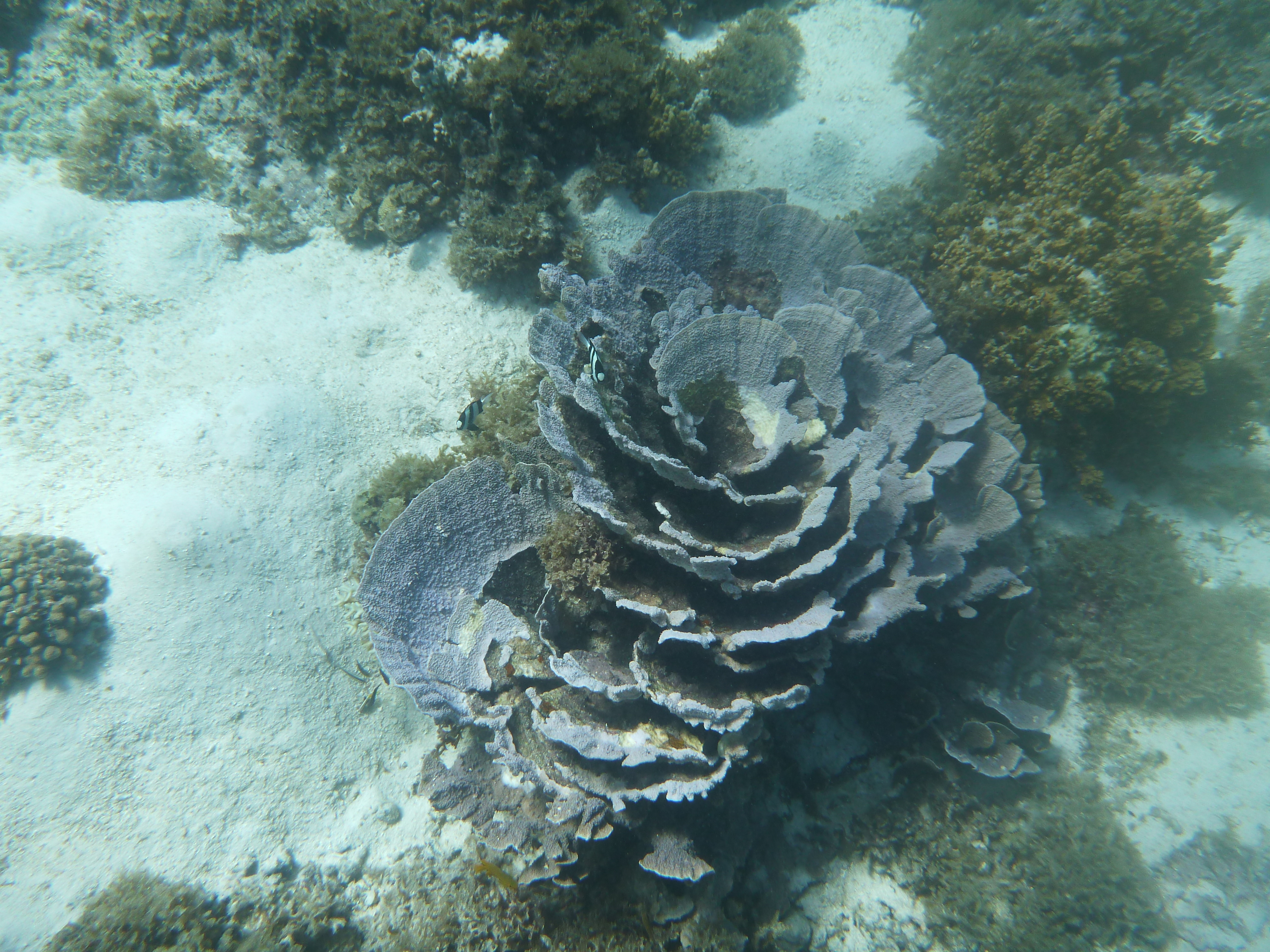
Part of the coral reef pictured underwater in 2012

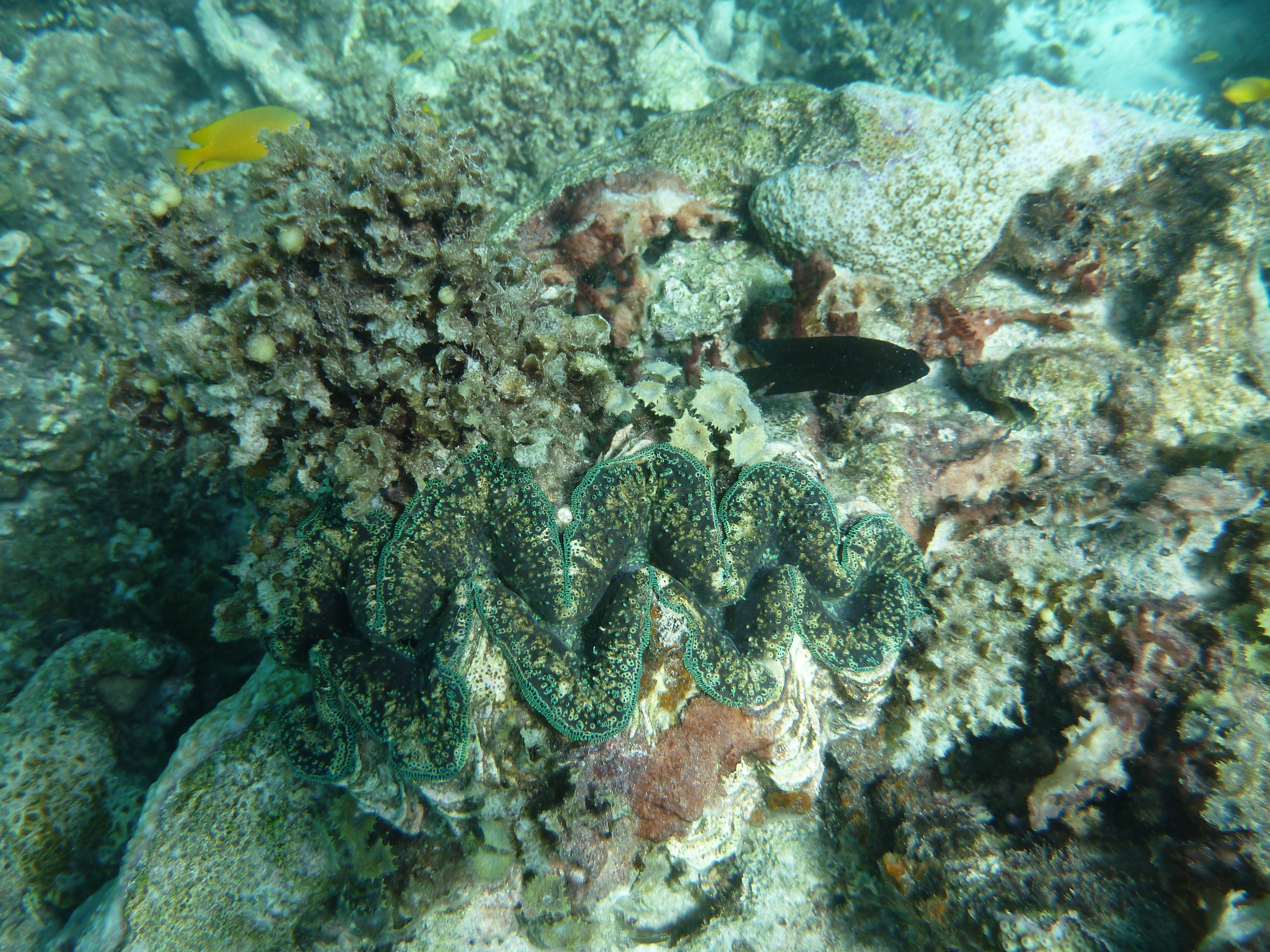
Large clam pictured underwater in 2012

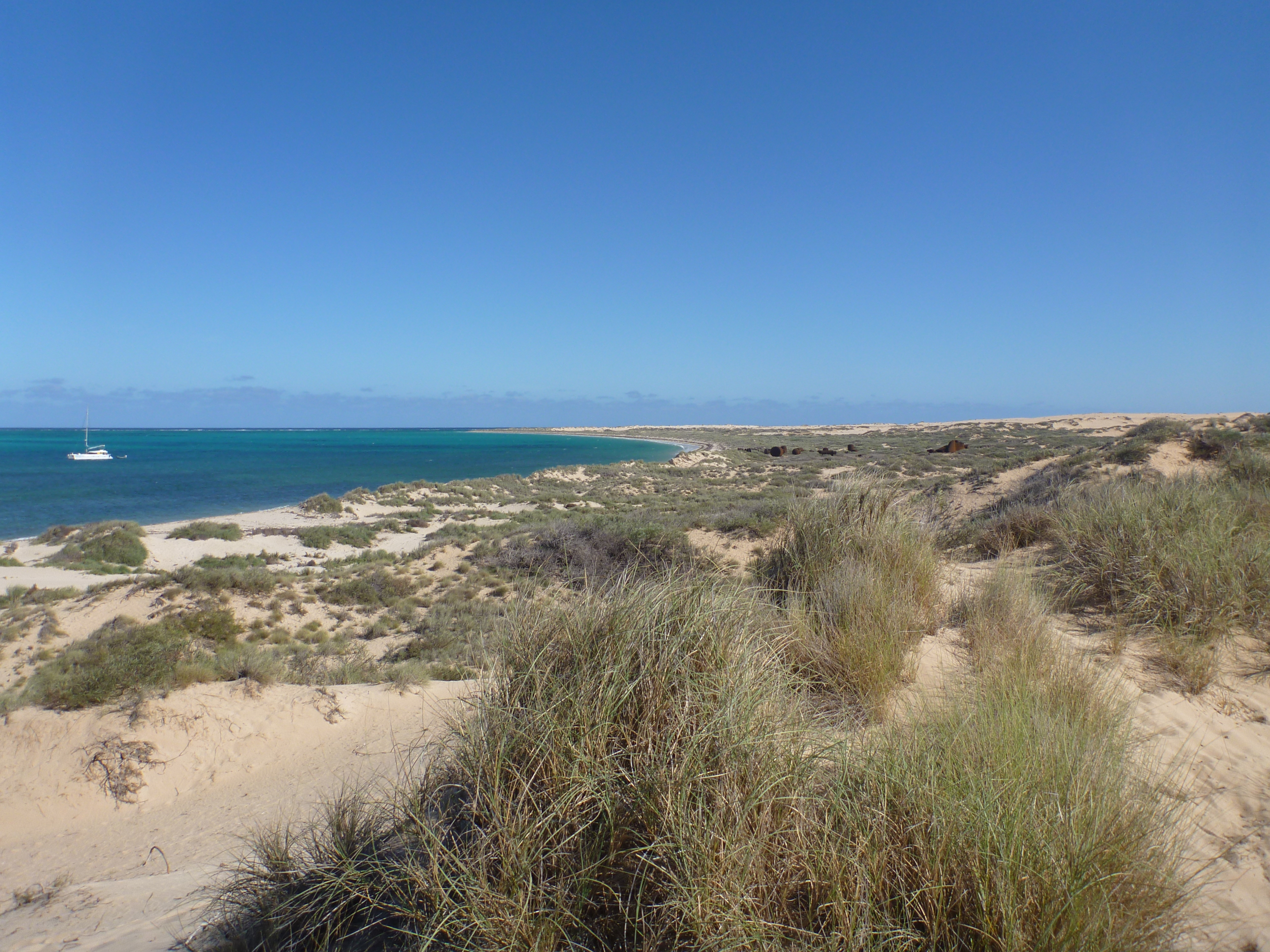
Ningaloo Coastline, 2012

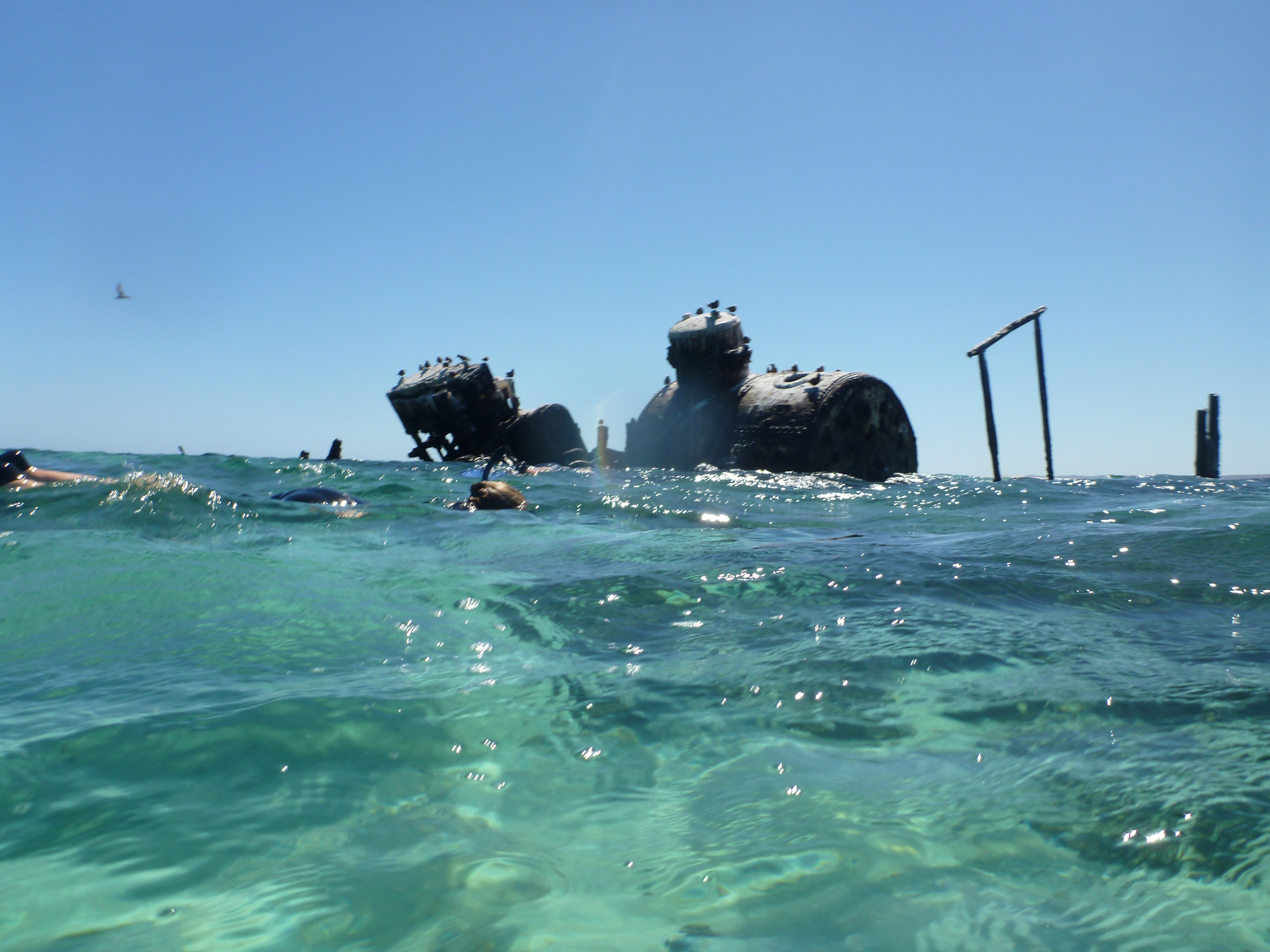
Snorkelers explore a ship wreck adjacent to the coral reef

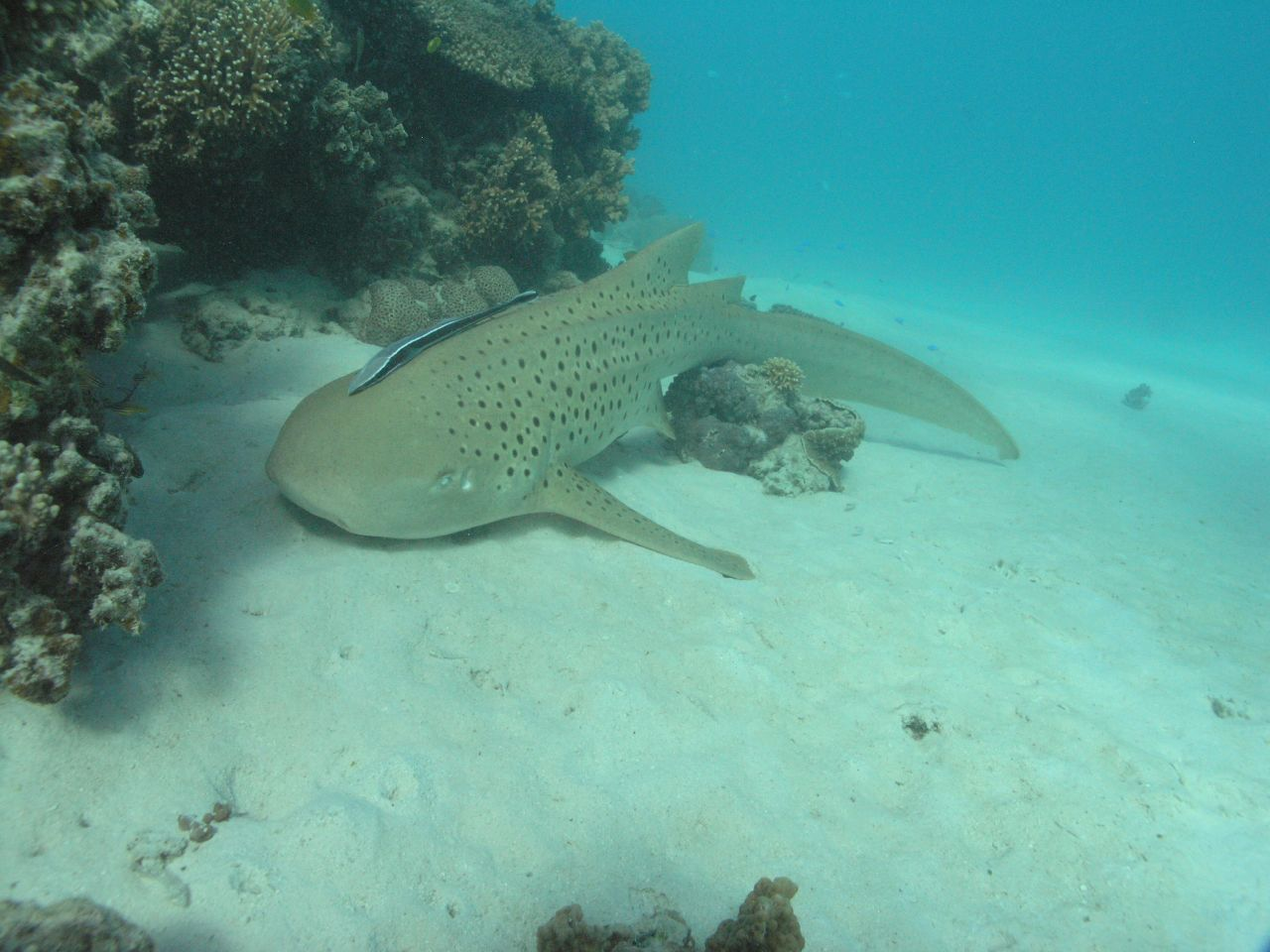
Stegostoma fasciatum (zebra shark) pictured on the reef in 2007

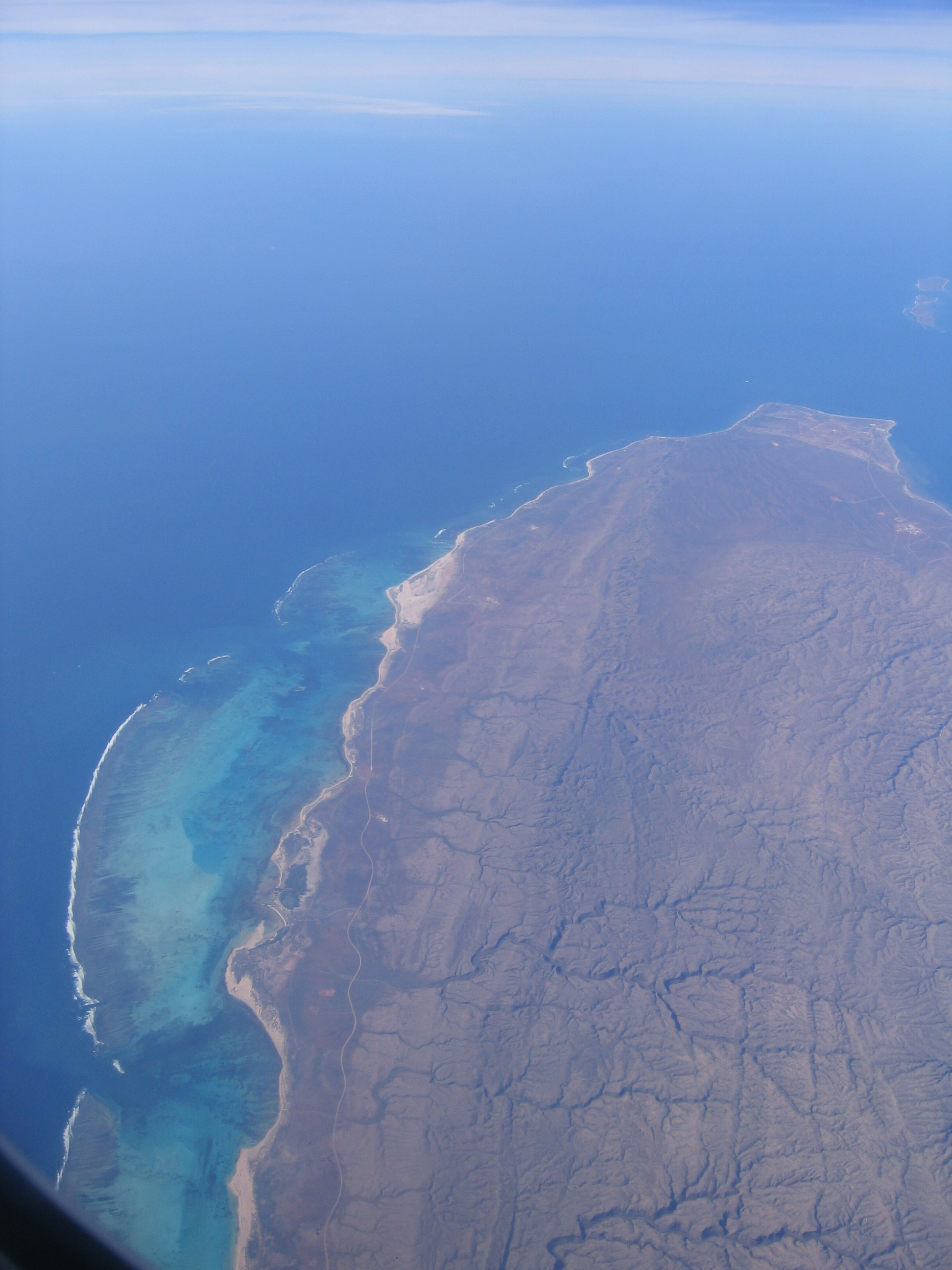
Cape Range National Park and Ningaloo Reef from the air

== See also ==
- Protected areas of Western Australia
- Gnaraloo
- Gnaraloo Turtle Conservation Program
- Ningaloo Station
- Warroora
