= Gnaraloo =

Pastoral lease in Western Australia

Coordinates: 23°49′16″S 113°31′33″E

Location in Western Australia

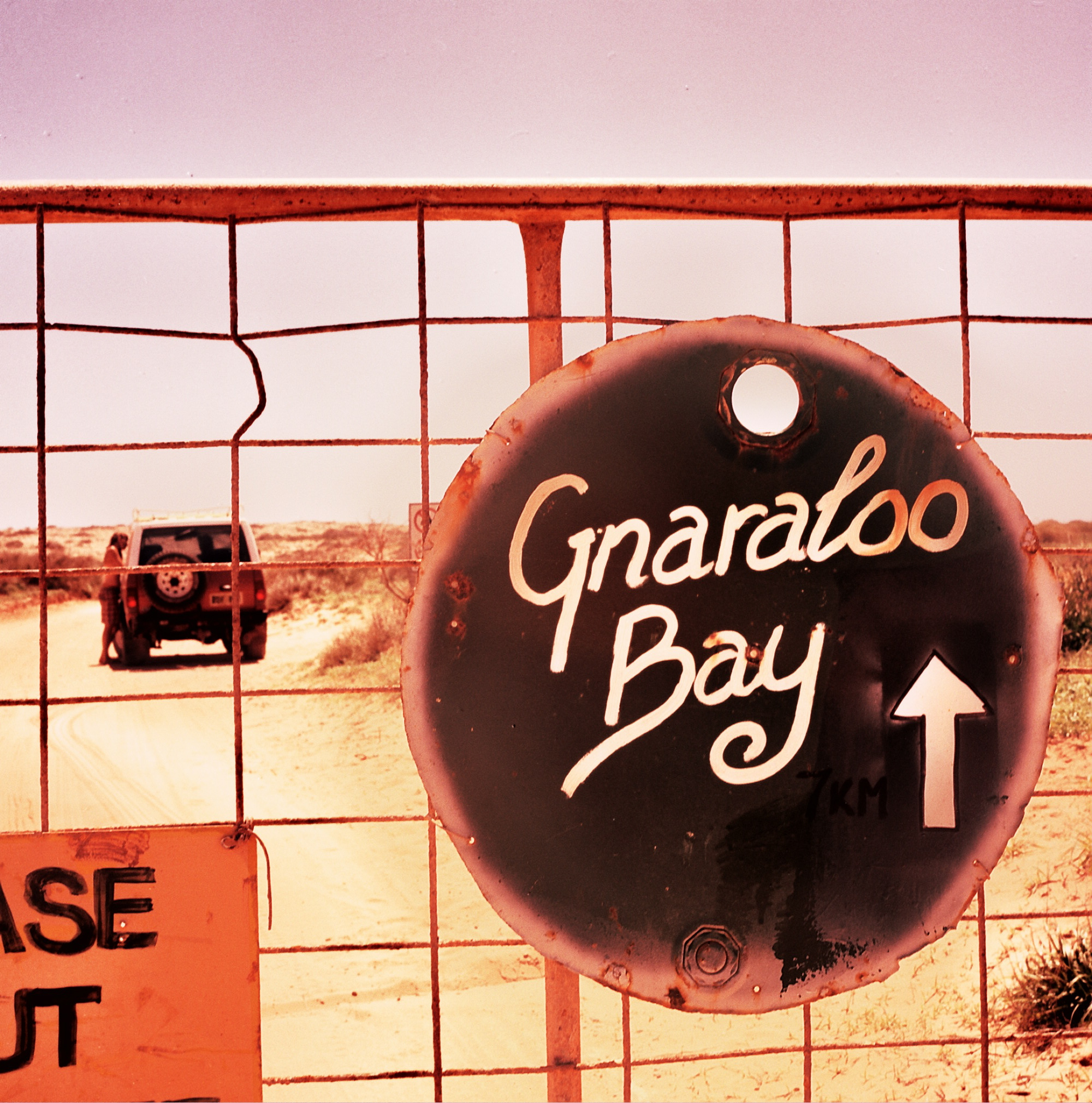
Track to Gnaraloo Bay

Gnaraloo is a working pastoral station and wilderness tourism business located in the Gnaraloo Bay in the Shire of Carnarvon, Western Australia. It is adjacent to the Ningaloo Marine Park and 150 km (93 mi) north of Carnarvon. It is famous for its coastline, wildlife and fishing and waves and wind.

The main surf break in the area is known as "Tombstones", which is a heavy barrelling left-hander.

== History ==
The area was pioneered by Donald Fleming who, in partnership with Arthur Nicol, took up land in the area including Gnaraloo. At the time it was known as "Flemington". He later sold it to Frank Mottram but stayed in the area until 1935. In 1908 the station was 90,000 acres (36,422 ha) in size and was held by Forrest, Emanuel and Co. who paid a £70 rental on the property. Under Mottram's ownership in 1910, the station was running about 1,500 sheep with the flock increasing in size to 3,554 in 1911 despite no stock being bought in that time. Following a good season another 800 lambs were tailed in 1912 increasing the size of the flock further.

The Mottrams sold the lease to Dansy Powell and Harry Cordes in 1921, with a flock of 9,000 sheep and now encompassing an area of 190,000 acres (76,890 ha) with the lease due to expire in 1948. The property was advertised with 70 miles (113 km) dividing it into 12 paddocks with 9 wells, 8 with windmills, tanks and troughs. The homestead had three large rooms, an office and a store room with a detached stone kitchen. The station had a good year in 1922 with 9,000 sheep shorn and with an estimated 1,500 stragglers to be mustered and clipped. 223 bales of wool were produced, and the stock were all reported to be in good condition.

Powell and Cordes sold the station in 1927 to a partnership between Alex Fleming and George Baden Powell. It station was sold again in 1928 when the Gnaraloo Pastoral Company formed between the Fleming and Powell families was dissolved; the Fleming family came to own the station outright again with Donald's son, Alex Fleming owning the station from 1928 until at least 1954. Gnaraloo remained in the Fleming family until 1975. Paul Richardson bought the station in 2005 and put it up for sale in 2025.

In 2015 the station owners had to renegotiate the lease agreement with the state government, including having the government excise sections of pastoral land along the world-heritage listed Ningaloo Coast from the property, for conservation and tourism ventures.

== Geography ==
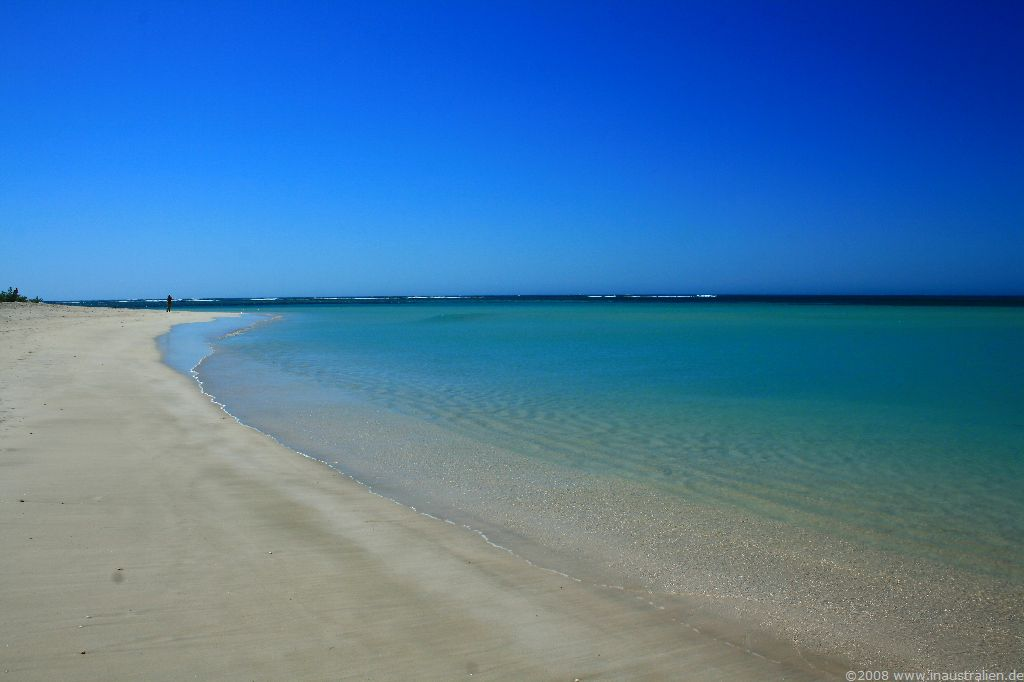
Gnaraloo Bay

=== Topography and surrounding regions ===
The homestead property is located on elevated ground approximately 500 m (1,600 ft) east of the coast and 16 km (9.9 mi) west of Lake MacLeod. The station has an area of 90,000 ha (222,395 acres) with approximately 65 km (40 mi) of coastline. Gnaraloo Bay contains four stretches of sandy beaches. They are paralleled by a near-continuous 200 to 500 m (660 to 1,640 ft) wide barrier reef 1.5 km (0.93 mi) off in the adjacent waters. The main beach is the Gnaraloo beach, located about 3 km (1.9 mi) south of the homestead and about 3.4 km (2.1 mi) in length. Nine Mile Bore and Cape Farquhar, each with three beaches, are located north of Gnaraloo Bay, just before Ningaloo. Red Bluff and the Quobba homestead are located at the south.

=== Climate ===
Gnaraloo has a mean and median annual rainfall of 203 and 230 mm (8.0 and 9.1 in) respectively. Most of which falls in May to July. The annual evaporation is c. 2,800 to 3,000 mm (110 to 120 in).

The area received heavy rains in 1953 with Gnaraloo being deluged with 610 points (155 mm, 6.1 in) of rain over two days. Surrounding stations received falls of up to 76 mm (3 in).

== Transportation ==
Gnaraloo can be reached by land from Carnarvon through the Gnaraloo road. A small airstrip is also present just outside the Gnaraloo leased area, but there are no scheduled flights. The airstrip was slated for an upgrade in 2008 to allow better access for the Royal Flying Doctor Service.

== Conservation ==
Gnaraloo station commenced its turtle conservation program in 2008 under the guidance and direction of the WA Department of Environment and Conservation (DEC). The Gnaraloo Turtle Conservation Program (GTCP) does daily patrols for the entire loggerhead nesting season (November–February).

A feral animal control program was implemented in 2009 to work alongside the sea turtle conservation program due to introduced predators being an environmental risk to sea turtle nest success.

In 2010 the station won the Environment Protection Category in the Keep Australia Beautiful's Clean Beach Awards, for its efforts in the conservation of the area's flora and fauna, particularly the Critically Endangered species of sea turtles nesting in the area.

The station borders a UNESCO World Heritage site and concerns were raised in 2021 in relation to the impact of the planned construction of wind turbines and solar panels onsite.

== See also ==
- List of pastoral leases in Western Australia
