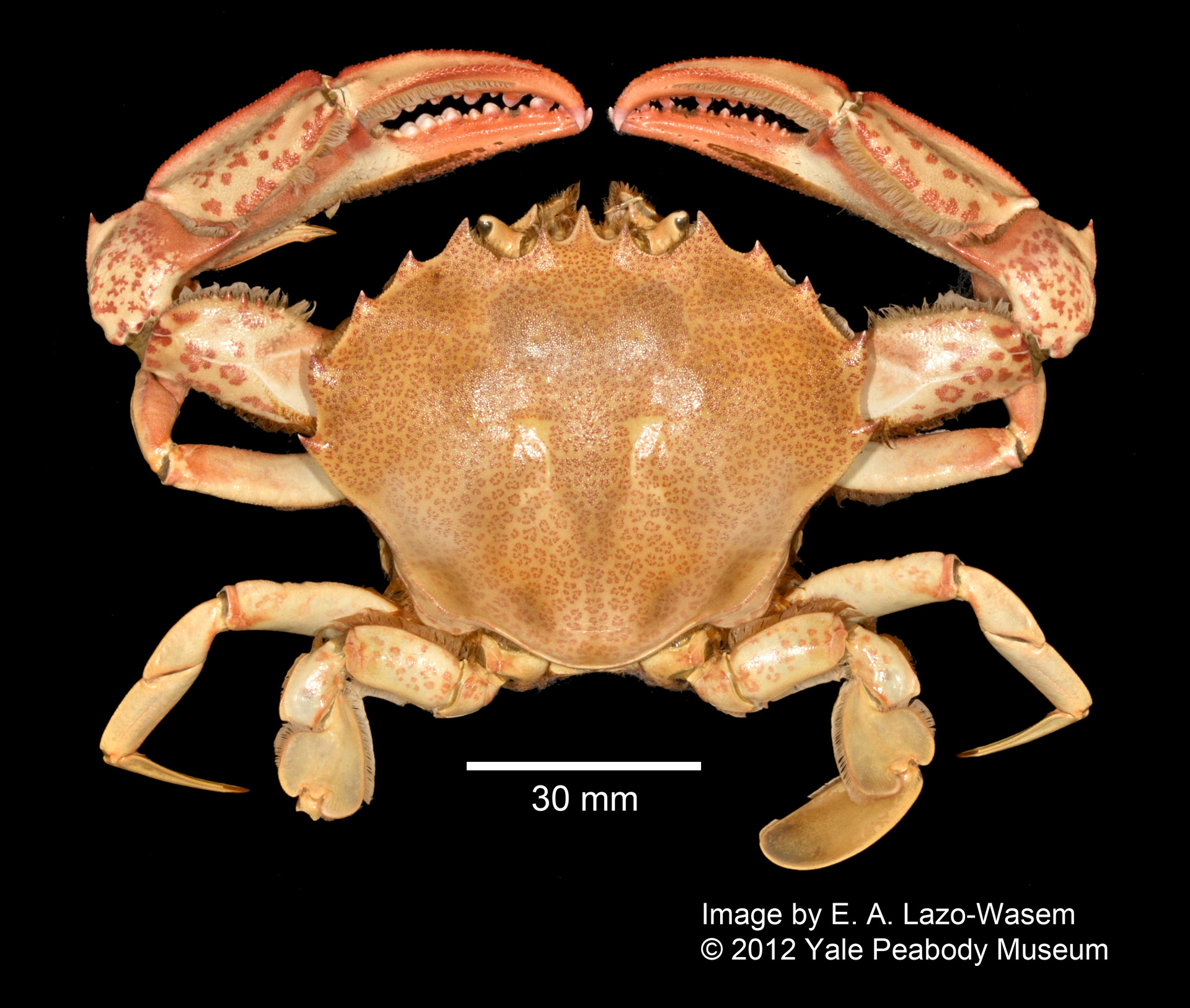

Scientific classification
- Kingdom: Animalia
- Phylum: Arthropoda
- Clade: Pancrustacea
- Class: Malacostraca
- Order: Decapoda
- Suborder: Pleocyemata
- Infraorder: Brachyura
- Family: Ovalipidae
- Genus: Ovalipes
- Species: O. ocellatus

Binomial name
- Ovalipes ocellatus (Herbst, 1799)

Synonyms
- Cancer ocellatus Herbst, 1799; Platyonichus ocellatus (Herbst, 1799); Portunus pictus Say, 1817

= Ovalipes ocellatus =

Species of crab

Ovalipes ocellatus, commonly known as the lady crab, (Note: Sometimes "northern lady crab") oscellated crab, (Note: Sometimes "ocellate lady crab") or calico crab, (Note: The nickname "calico crab" is shared with Hepatus epheliticus.) is a species of crab in the family Ovalipidae.

== Description ==
The carapace of O. ocellatus is slightly wider than long, at 8.9 centimetres (3.5 in) wide, and 7.5 cm (3.0 in) long. The carapace is yellow-grey or light purplish, with "leopardlike clusters of purple dots". It exhibits a limited iridescence as a form of signalling.

== Taxonomy ==
Ovalipes ocellatus is commonly known as the lady crab, oscellated crab, or calico crab. It was first described in 1799 by naturalist Johann Friedrich Wilhelm Herbst, who placed it into the genus Cancer. In 1898, carcinologist Mary Jane Rathbun moved the species to her new genus Ovalipes. O. ocellatus is part of a distinct group of Ovalipes which also includes O. floridanus, O. iridescens, O. molleri, and O. stephensoni. (Note: This group – one of two – is distinguished from the rest of Ovalipes by features such as iridescence, lack of a tooth at the top of its orbit, and a carina ending in a spine on the outer wrist.) O. ocellatus is almost identical to O. floridanus, which lives in the Gulf of Mexico, but can be separated from the sympatric O. stephensoni by purple spots which O. stephensoni lacks. The following cladogram based on morphology shows the relationship between O. catharus and the other extant species of Ovalipes: (Note: Ovalipes itself sits within the monogeneric family Ovalipidae.)

- Ovalipes
  - - Ovalipes georgei
    - - - - - Ovalipes australiensis
            - Ovalipes punctatus
          - Ovalipes elongatus
        - Ovalipes trimaculatus
      - Ovalipes catharus
  - - - - - Ovalipes ocellatus
          - Ovalipes stephensoni
        - Ovalipes floridanus
      - - Ovalipes iridescens
        - Ovalipes molleri

== Distribution ==
The distribution of Ovalipes ocellatus extends along North America's Atlantic coast from Canada to Georgia. O. ocellatus is "probably the only Ovalipes species common north of Virginia", being replaced by Ovalipes stephensoni to the south.

== Diet ==
The diet of Ovalipes ocellatus consists predominantly of bivalves, crustaceans including other crabs, polychaetes, cephalopods, and gastropods. It rarely feeds on fish.

== Life cycle ==
Ovalipes ocellatus has five zoeal (larval) stages, lasting a total of 18 days at 25 °C (77 °F) and a salinity of 30‰, and 26 days at 20 °C (68 °F) and 30‰.

== Ecology ==
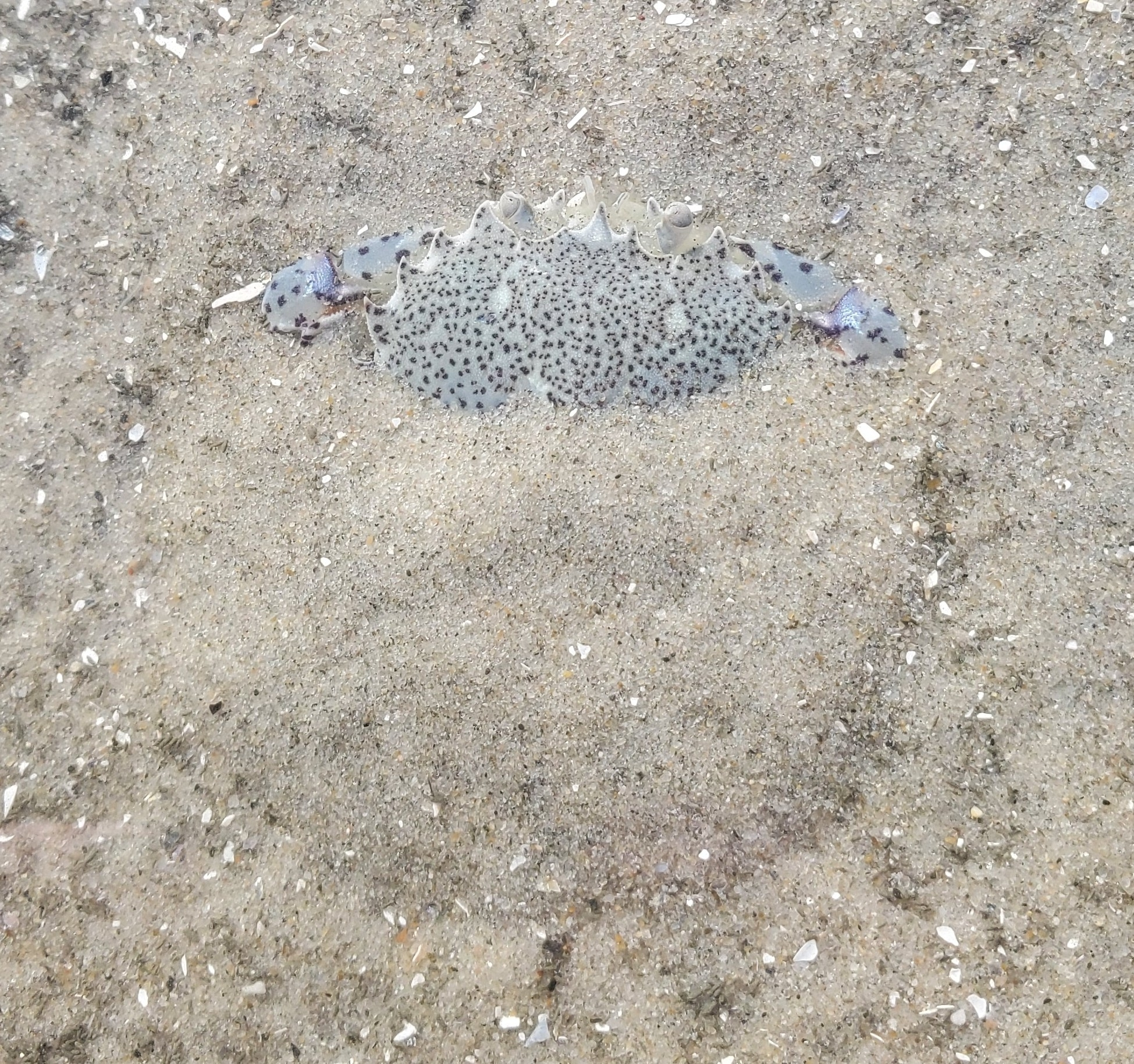
Ovalipes ocellatus often buries itself in the sand.

Ovalipes ocellatus is nocturnal and often buries itself in the sand. It has been described as "vicious" and "the crab most likely to pinch a wader's toes".
