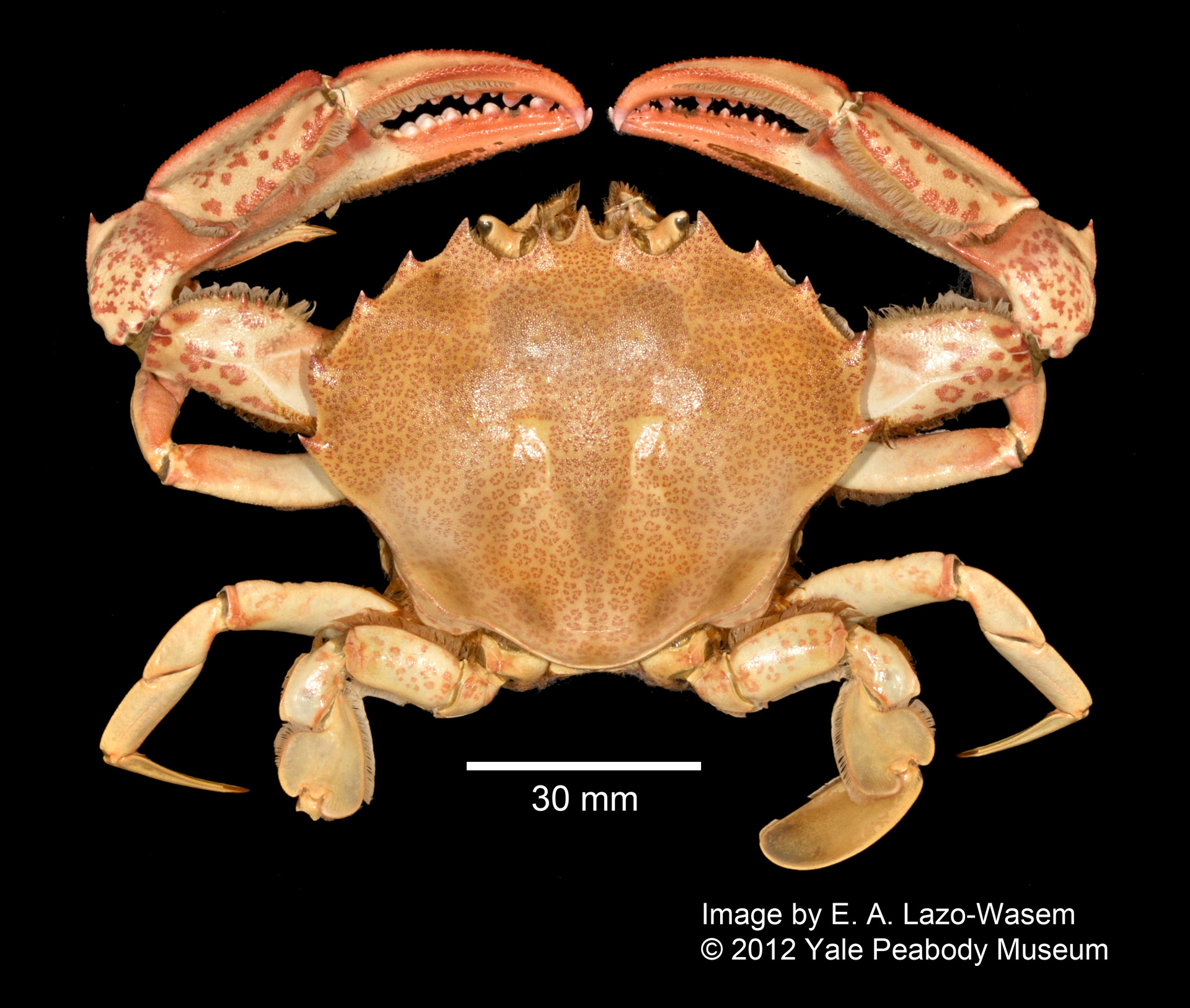
- Ovalipes ocellatus

Scientific classification
- Kingdom: Animalia
- Phylum: Arthropoda
- Clade: Pancrustacea
- Class: Malacostraca
- Order: Decapoda
- Suborder: Pleocyemata
- Infraorder: Brachyura
- Family: Ovalipidae
- Genus: Ovalipes; Rathbun, 1898

Type species
- Ovalipes ocellatus (Herbst, 1799)

Synonyms
- Anisopus De Haan, 1833; Aeneacancer Ward, 1933; Corystes De Haan, 1833

= Ovalipes =

Genus of crabs

Ovalipes is a genus of crabs in the family Ovalipidae.

== Taxonomy ==
The genus was first described by Mary J. Rathbun in 1898 and contains the following species:

- Ovalipes australiensis Stephenson & Rees, 1968
- Ovalipes catharus (White, 1843)
- Ovalipes elongatus Stephenson & Rees, 1968
- Ovalipes floridanus Hay & Shore, 1918
- †Ovalipes formosanus Hu & Tao, 1996
- Ovalipes georgei Stephenson & Rees, 1968
- Ovalipes iridescens (Miers in Tizard, Moseley, Buchanan & Murray, 1885)
- Ovalipes molleri (Ward, 1933)
- Ovalipes ocellatus (Herbst, 1799)
- Ovalipes punctatus (De Haan, 1833)
- Ovalipes stephensoni Williams, 1976
- Ovalipes trimaculatus (De Haan, 1833)

The following cladogram shows the relationship between the extant species of Ovalipes:

- Ovalipes
  - - Ovalipes georgei
    - - - - - Ovalipes australiensis
            - Ovalipes punctatus
          - Ovalipes elongatus
        - Ovalipes trimaculatus
      - Ovalipes catharus
  - - - - - Ovalipes ocellatus
          - Ovalipes stephensoni
        - Ovalipes floridanus
      - - Ovalipes iridescens
        - Ovalipes molleri
