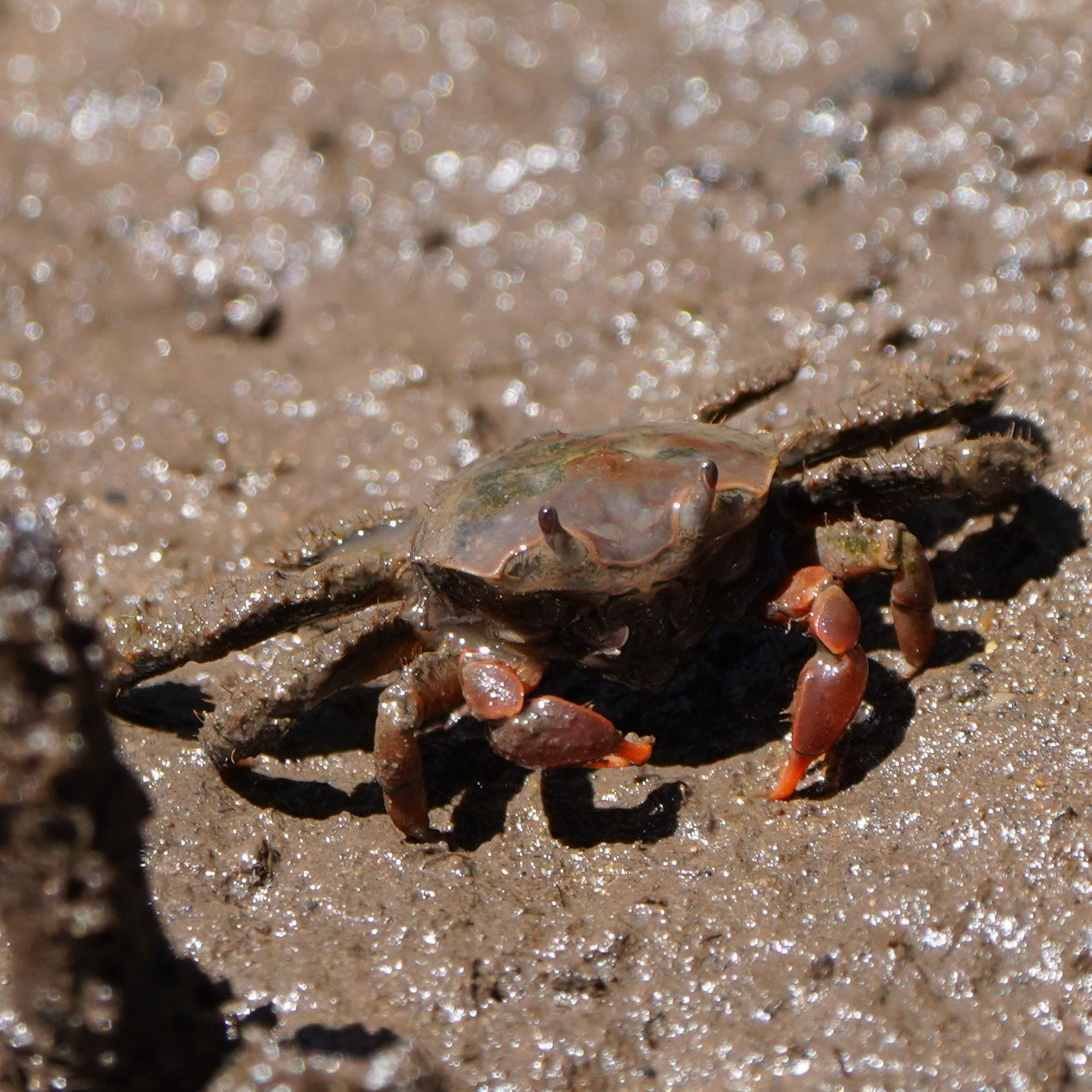

Scientific classification
- Kingdom: Animalia
- Phylum: Arthropoda
- Clade: Pancrustacea
- Class: Malacostraca
- Order: Decapoda
- Suborder: Pleocyemata
- Infraorder: Brachyura
- Family: Camptandriidae
- Genus: Paracleistostoma
- Species: P. wardi

Binomial name
- Paracleistostoma wardi (Rathbun, 1926)

= Paracleistostoma wardi =

Species of crab

Paracleistostoma wardi is a species of crab first described as Cleistostoma wardi in 1926 by zoologist Mary J. Rathbun and named after former actor, marine collector and later honorary zoologist Charles Melbourne Ward. The type specimens were from mudflats in Sandgate, Queensland, Australia. It is known as Ward's hairy-legged crab, with Rathbun describing it as having "Ambulatory legs" which are "densely hairy". The crabs are small with holotypes 17.6 mm across the carapace and 12.2 mm long. The claws are red to maroon, with the upper moveable male claw (dactyl) having one tooth, at the base. There is orange coloration at the front edges of the carapace behind the eyes. The carapace is smooth, slightly convex, and has no teeth on the sides and looks cut-off at the front edges. It is found in Queensland from Moreton Bay to Cairns.
