= Paracleistostoma depressum =

Scientific classification
- Domain: Eukaryota
- Kingdom: Animalia
- Phylum: Arthropoda
- Class: Malacostraca
- Order: Decapoda
- Suborder: Pleocyemata
- Infraorder: Brachyura
- Family: Camptandriidae
- Genus: Paracleistostoma
- Species: P. depressum

Binomial name
- Paracleistostoma depressum de Man, 1895

Species of crab

Paracleistostoma depressum is an Asian-endemic species of crab common in Southeast Asia. They are found in Singapore, the west coast of the Malay Peninsula and the Hainan and Fujian provinces in of China. They are found in seawater and the mud area in brink water.
