= Moguai (crab) =

Scientific classification
- Domain: Eukaryota
- Kingdom: Animalia
- Phylum: Arthropoda
- Class: Malacostraca
- Order: Decapoda
- Suborder: Pleocyemata
- Infraorder: Brachyura
- Family: Camptandriidae
- Genus: Moguai; C. G. S. Tan & Ng, 1999

Genus of crabs

Moguai is a genus of crabs. The name comes from the Chinese pinyin, which literally means "devil". It contains three species:

- Moguai aloutos C. G. S. Tan & Ng, 1999
- Moguai elongatum (Rathbun, 1931)
- Moguai pyriforme Naruse, 2005
