= Moreton Bay Research Station =

Australian research center

Coordinates: 27°29′48″S 153°24′00″E

The Moreton Bay Research Station is a marine biology research centre located on North Stradbroke Island, off the coast of Brisbane, Queensland, Australia, in Moreton Bay and the Pacific Ocean.

== History ==
Established in 1949 as the Dunwich Laboratory, the station was a facility established by the Queensland government. It was designed to encourage use and shared research between CSIRO fisheries division, the Queensland Department of Harbours and Marine (Fisheries) and the University of Queensland. It was initially run by CSIRO staff, in particular, Dr J.M. Thomson who lived on site from 1949 to 1953.

== Location ==
The station is located on North Stradbroke Island, a 27,700-hectare sand island, 30 minutes from Brisbane by boat. The island lies between the sub-tropical and temperate zones, and its waters feature a wide range of terrestrial, coastal and marine ecosystems. Mud flats surround the island, providing an estuarine environment which supports worms and bivalves and other tiny organisms. There is also a large dugong population which feeds off the seagrass. Coral reefs remain close by at Peel Island.

== Early research ==
Research at the station evolved from the study of oyster and sea mullet fisheries in Moreton Bay, to more general marine research. CSIRO abandoned the station in 1959, and it was taken over by the University of Queensland. Prof. William Stephenson, a biologist at the university, had used the station regularly as a teaching destination for undergraduate and postgraduate student field trips. He petitioned the Queensland government to permit the university to take over part of the station, and develop its teaching and research facilities.

== Development of the teaching facilities ==
The laboratory was renamed the Dunwich Marine Station (DMS) in 1961, becoming the first marine station managed by the University of Queensland. It would be joined by the Heron Island Research Station in the 1970s. Facilities were basic, with a bunkhouse, two-storey lab, engine room and kitchen/mess hall. Livestock roamed the streets and foreshore, and students had easy access to Rainbow Channel.

In the 1990s, the facilities were showing wear and tear and needed to be upgraded for teaching purposes. Funding was sought from the university in 1997 to demolish the old buildings, and construct a modern, purpose-designed teaching and research facility. This would accommodate 96 students and researchers and provide high-speed internet access and a microwave internet link. The improved boating and diving facilities would attract scientists and researchers from all over the world. The new Moreton Bay Research Station and Study Centre (MBRS) was opened on 23 June 2000, by the Honourable Peter Beattie, MLA, with funding provided by the University of Queensland, the Port of Brisbane Corporation, the Royal Queensland Yacht Squadron and Consolidated Rutile Limited (now Sibelco Australia).
