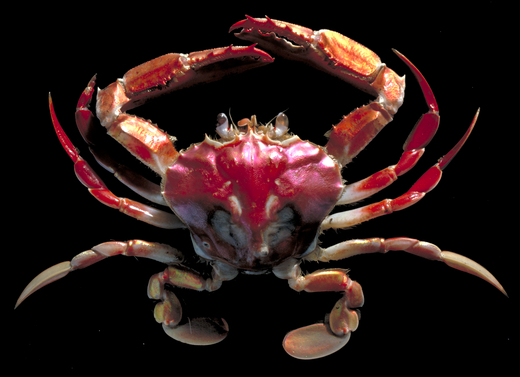

Scientific classification
- Kingdom: Animalia
- Phylum: Arthropoda
- Clade: Pancrustacea
- Class: Malacostraca
- Order: Decapoda
- Suborder: Pleocyemata
- Infraorder: Brachyura
- Family: Ovalipidae
- Genus: Ovalipes
- Species: O. molleri

Binomial name
- Ovalipes molleri (Ward, 1933)

Synonyms
- Aeneacancer molleri Ward, 1933

= Ovalipes molleri =

Species of crab

Ovalipes catharus is a species of crab in the family Ovalipidae.
