= Paracleistostoma =

Scientific classification
- Domain: Eukaryota
- Kingdom: Animalia
- Phylum: Arthropoda
- Class: Malacostraca
- Order: Decapoda
- Suborder: Pleocyemata
- Infraorder: Brachyura
- Family: Camptandriidae
- Genus: Paracleistostoma de Man, 1895

Genus of crabs

Paracleistostoma is a genus of crabs in the family Camptandriidae. It used to be a member of Ocypodidae, but the genus has since been reclassified. They are found in Singapore, the west coast of the Malay Peninsula and the Hainan and Fujian provinces in of China. They are found in seawater and the mud area in brink water.

== Species ==
- Paracleistostoma crassipilum Dai, Yang, Song & Chen, 1986
- Paracleistostoma depressum de Man, 1895
- Paracleistostoma eriophorum Nobili, 1903
- Paracleistostoma fossulum Barnard, 1955
- Paracleistostoma japonicum Sakai, 1934
- Paracleistostoma laciniatum Rahayu & Ng, 2003
- Paracleistostoma longimanum Tweedie, 1937
- Paracleistostoma quadratum Rahayu & Ng, 2003
- Paracleistostoma tomentosum Yang & Sun, 1993
- Paracleistostoma wardi (Rathbun, 1926)
