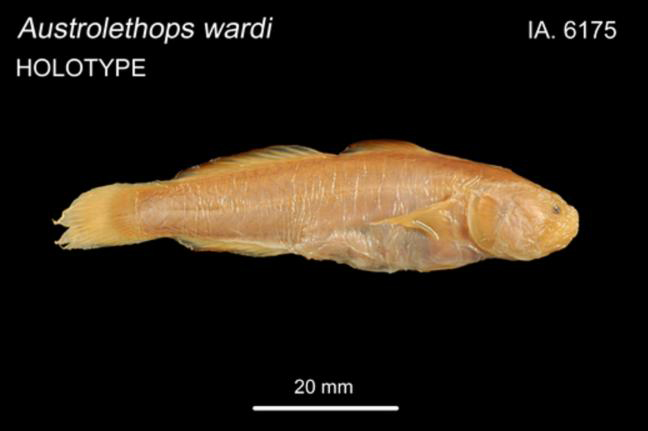
- holotype

Conservation status
- Least Concern (IUCN 3.1)

Scientific classification
- Kingdom: Animalia
- Phylum: Chordata
- Class: Actinopterygii
- Order: Gobiiformes
- Family: Gobiidae
- Genus: Austrolethops
- Species: A. wardi

Binomial name
- Austrolethops wardi Whitley, 1935

= Small-eyed goby =

Species of fish

The small-eyed goby (Austrolethops wardi) is a species of goby native to tropical reefs of the Indian Ocean through the western Pacific Ocean where it inhabits areas of coral rubble. As its common name suggests, this species has particularly small eyes. This species grows to a length of 6 centimetres (2.4 in) TL. This species is the only known member of its genus. The small-eyed goby is specialised to feed on seagrass and they share a burrows with mud lobsters of the genus Thalassina. The specific name honours Charles Melbourne Ward (1903–1966), the Australian actor, naturalist and collector of specimens who collected the type specimen.
