= Moulting =

Process by which an animal routinely casts off a part of its body

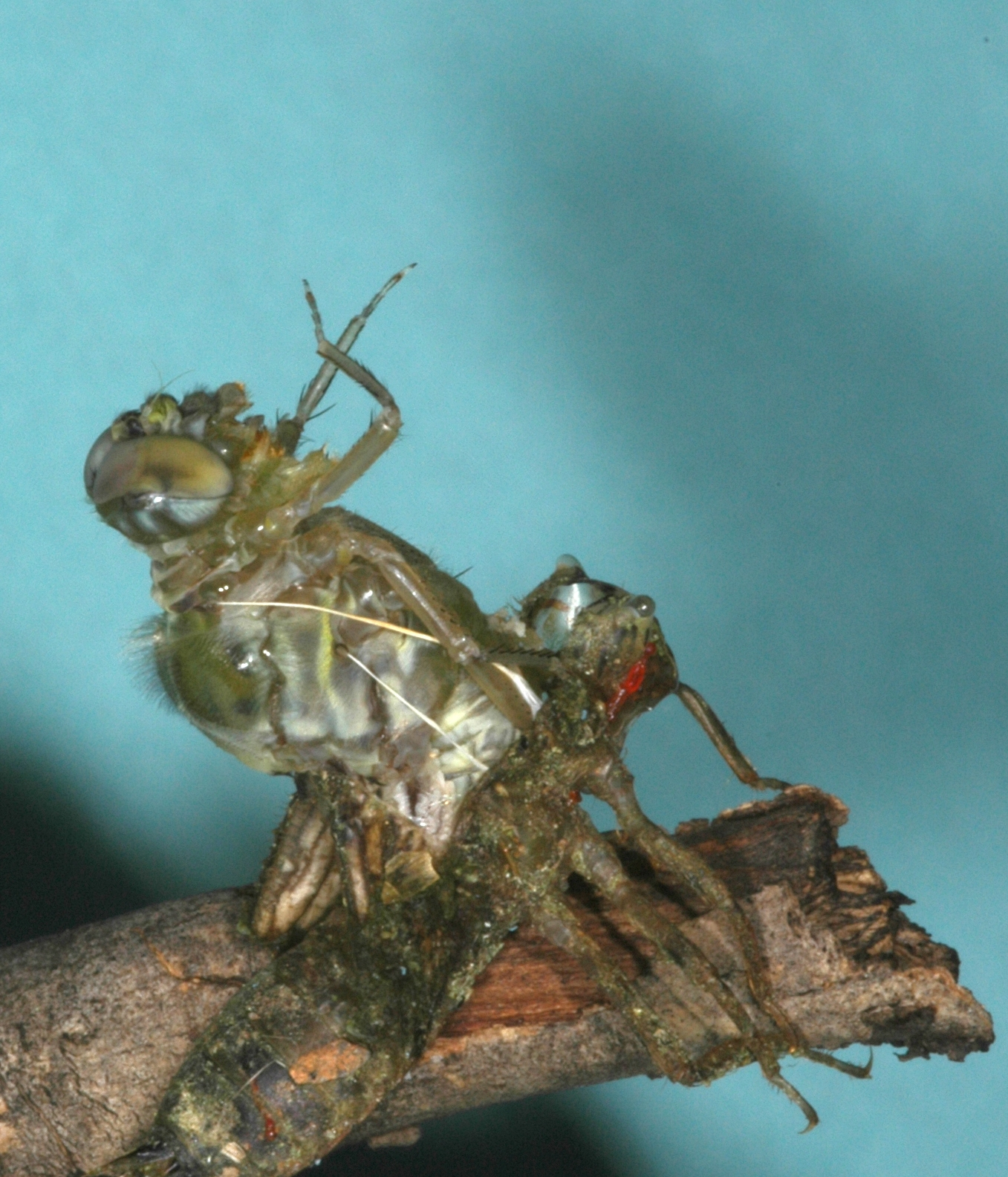
A dragonfly in its radical final moult, metamorphosing from an aquatic nymph to a winged adult

In biology, moulting (British English), or molting (American English), also known as sloughing, shedding, or in many invertebrates, ecdysis, is a process by which an animal casts off parts of its body to serve some beneficial purpose, either at specific times of the year, or at specific points in its life cycle.

In medieval times, it was also known as "mewing" (from the French verb "muer", to moult), a term that lives on in the name of Britain's Royal Mews where the King's hawks used to be kept during moulting time before becoming horse stables after Tudor times.

Moulting can involve shedding the epidermis (skin), pelage (hair, feathers, fur, wool), or other external layer. In some groups, other body parts may be shed, for example, the entire exoskeleton in arthropods, including the wings in some insects.

== Examples ==
Group	Item shed	Timing	Notes
Cats	Fur	Usually around spring-summer time	Cats moult fur around spring-summer time to get rid of their "winter coat". Cats have thicker fur during the colder winter months to keep them warm, then around spring and summer they shed some of their fur to get a thinner coat for the warmer summer months. Some cats need brushing during moulting, since dead hairs can get trapped in the cat's fur.
Dogs and other canids	Fur	Semi-annually, spring and fall (autumn).	Moulting or shedding in canids, as in all mammals, is due to fluctuations in the amount of melatonin secreted by their pineal gland in response to seasonal sunlight variations rather than temperature variations. This seasonality in moulting is most preserved in Arctic breeds of dogs which shed twice each year whereas most other breeds moult once each year.
Chickens	Feathers	Usually autumn (non-commercial hens).	Chickens generally stop laying eggs when their moulting begins and recommence laying when their new feathers have re-grown.
Mallards	Feathers	Mid-summer - early fall	After the end of the breeding season, most mallards moult their flight feathers. As the brightly coloured breeding plumage of the males leaves them vulnerable to predation, they lose it through moulting, replacing it with eclipse plumage that aids in camouflage until their flight feathers regrow, upon which they moult again and regain their breeding colours.
Snakes	Skin	Regularly, when old skin is outgrown.	Snakes rub against rough surfaces to assist removal of their shed skin.
Lizards	Skin	Regularly, when old skin is outgrown.	Lizards, like snakes, rub against objects to help remove their shed skin and then consume the shed skin for calcium and other nutrients.
Amphibians	Skin	Regularly.	Salamanders and frogs shed their skins regularly, then often eat it.
Hermit crabs	Exoskeleton	Regularly, when the carapace is outgrown.	Land hermit crabs bury themselves for many weeks while they moult and then consume their exoskeleton.
Arachnids	Exoskeleton	Regularly, when the exoskeleton is outgrown.	Arachnids moult regularly to grow, often becoming reclusive and fasting for long periods prior to a moult.
Insects	Exoskeleton	Regularly in larvae, when the exoskeleton is outgrown.	In species with a "complete" metamorphosis, the final moult transforms the body, typically from a soft-bodied larva to a reproductive, winged and sometimes colourful adult. In mayflies, a winged subimago moults one last time to a winged adult.

== In birds ==
Loggerhead shrike moulting.	Loggerhead shrike with normal plumage.
A loggerhead shrike in mid-moult (left) and with regular plumage (right)

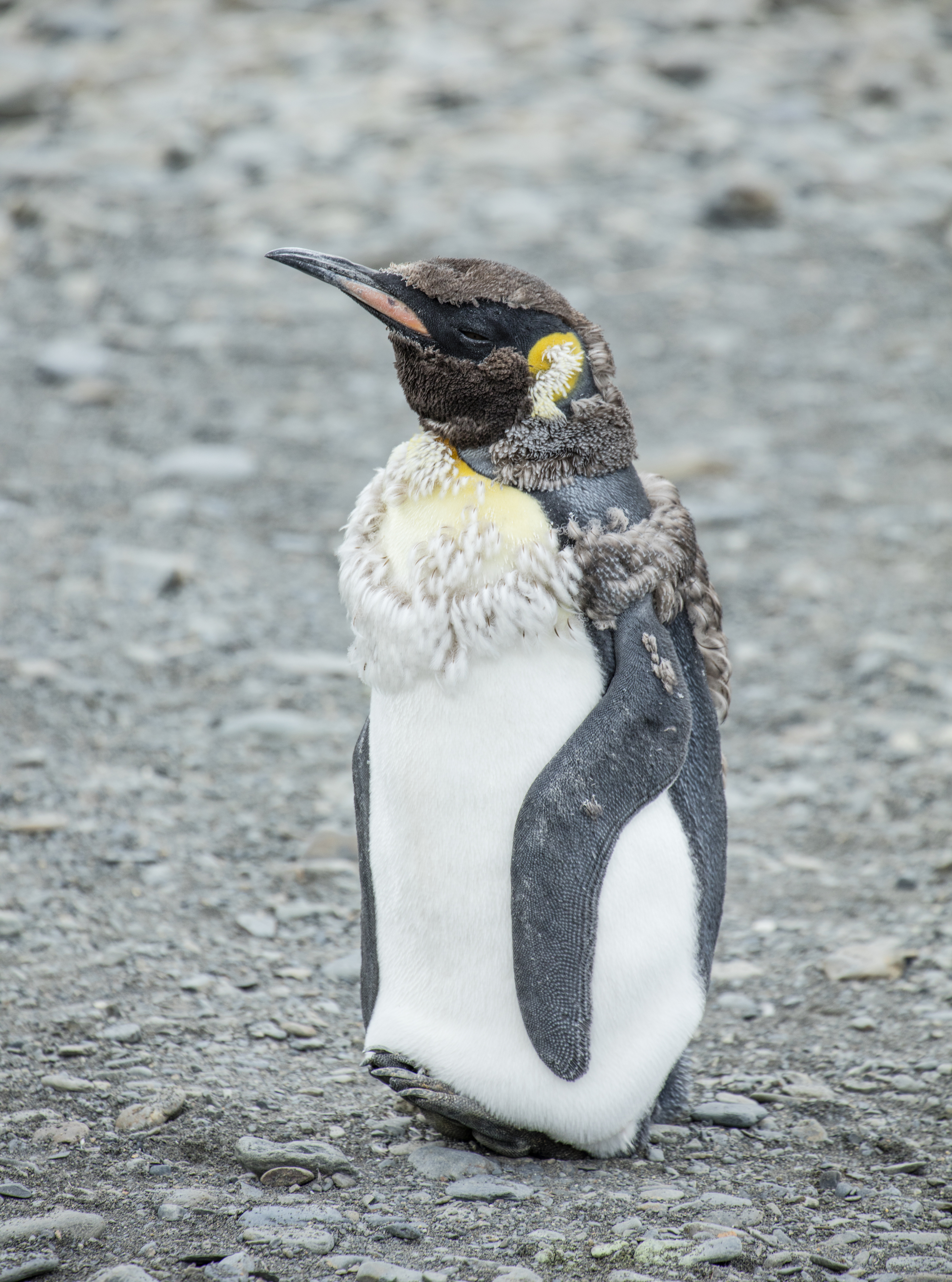
A juvenile king penguin moulting out its brown chick down and growing its first dark grey and white adult feathers

In birds, moulting is the periodic replacement of feathers by shedding old feathers while producing new ones. Feathers are dead structures at maturity which are gradually abraded and need to be replaced. Adult birds moult at least once a year, although many moult multiple times each year. It is generally a slow process: birds rarely shed all their feathers at any one time. The bird must retain sufficient feathers to regulate its body temperature and repel moisture. The number and area of feathers that are shed varies. In some moulting periods, a bird may renew only the feathers on the head and body, shedding the wing and tail feathers during a later moulting period.

Some species of bird become flightless during an annual "wing moult" and must seek a protected habitat with a reliable food supply during that time. While the plumage may appear thin or uneven during the moult, the bird's general shape is maintained despite the loss of apparently many feathers; bald spots are typically signs of unrelated illnesses, such as gross injuries, parasites, feather pecking (especially in commercial poultry), or (in pet birds) feather plucking. Some birds will drop feathers, especially tail feathers, in what is called a "fright moult".

The process of moulting in birds is as follows: First, the bird begins to shed some old feathers, then pin feathers grow in to replace the old feathers. As the pin feathers become full feathers, other feathers are shed. This is a cyclical process that occurs in many phases. It is usually symmetrical, with feather loss equal on each side of the body. Because feathers make up 4–12% of a bird's body weight, it takes a large amount of energy to replace them.

For this reason, moults often occur immediately after the breeding season, but while food is still abundant. The plumage produced during this time is called postnuptial plumage. Prenuptial moulting occurs in red-collared widowbirds where the males replace their nonbreeding plumage with breeding plumage. It is thought that large birds can advance the moult of severely damaged feathers.

Determining the process birds go through during moult can be useful in understanding breeding, migration and foraging strategies. One non-invasive method of studying moult in birds is through using field photography. The evolutionary and ecological forces driving moult can also be investigated using intrinsic markers such as stable hydrogen isotope (δ2H) analysis. In some tropical birds, such as the common bulbul, breeding seasonality is weak at the population level, instead moult can show high seasonality with individuals probably under strong selection to match moult with peak environmental conditions.

A 2023 paleontological analysis concluded that moulting probably evolved late in the evolutionary lineage of birds.

=== Forced moulting ===
In some countries, flocks of commercial layer hens are force-moulted to reinvigorate egg-laying. This usually involves complete withdrawal of their food and sometimes water for 7–14 days or up to 28 days under experimental conditions, which presumably reflect standard farming practice in some countries. This causes a body weight loss of 25 to 35%, which stimulates the hen to lose her feathers, but also reinvigorates egg-production.

Some flocks may be force-moulted several times. In 2003, more than 75% of all flocks were force-moulted in the US. Other methods of inducing a moult include low-density diets (e.g. grape pomace, cotton seed meal, alfalfa meal) or dietary manipulation to create an imbalance of a particular nutrient(s). The most important among these include manipulation of minerals including sodium (Na), calcium (Ca), iodine (I) and zinc (Zn), with full or partially reduced dietary intakes.

== In reptiles and amphibians ==
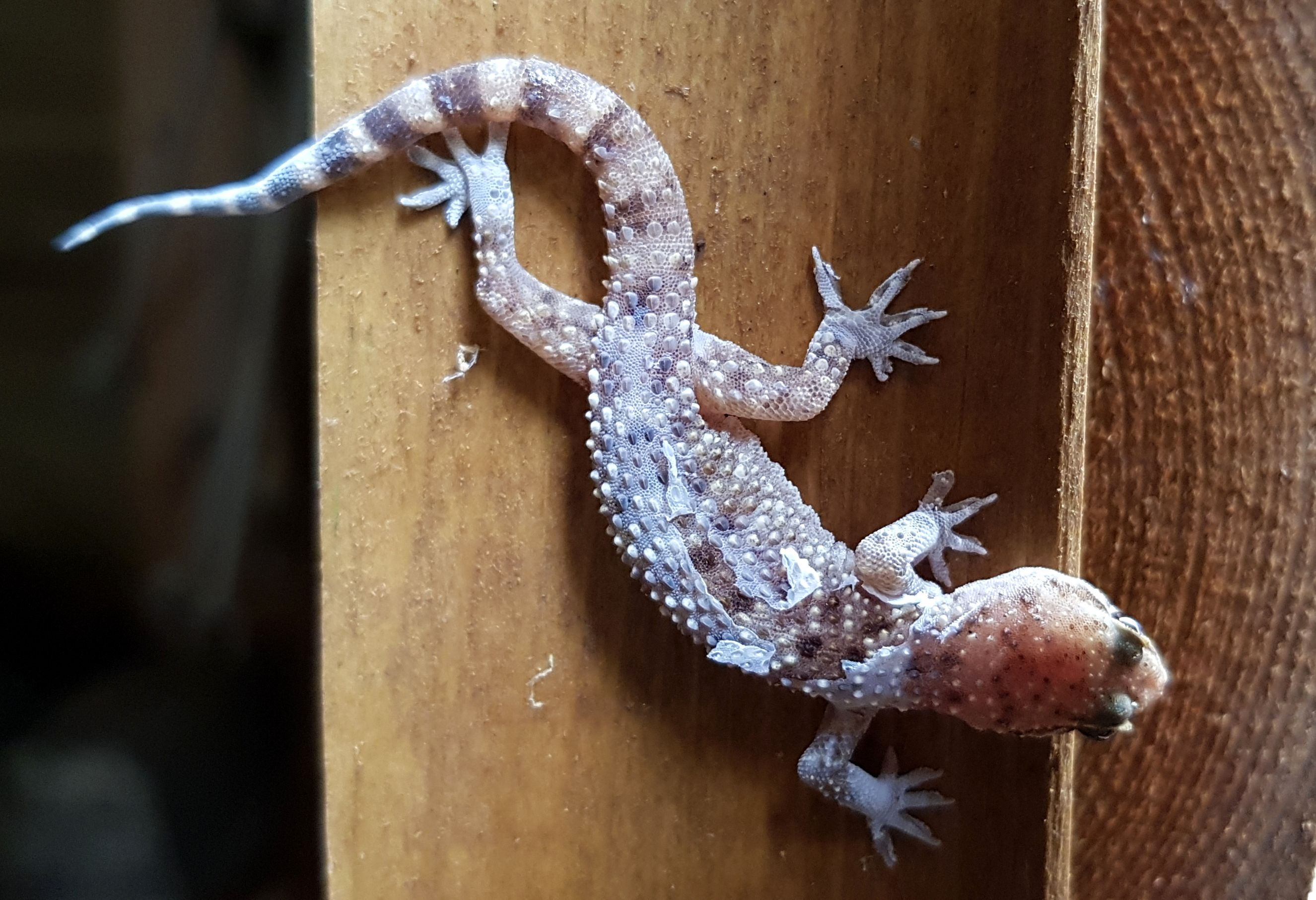
A young Mediterranean house gecko in the process of moulting

Close up view of snake's moulted skin	A black-bearded gliding lizard moulting
Close up view of snake's moulted skin (left) and a black-bearded gliding lizard moulting (right)

Squamates periodically engage in moulting, as their skin is scaly. The most familiar example of moulting in such reptiles is when snakes "shed their skin". This is usually achieved by the snake rubbing its head against a hard object, such as a rock (or between two rocks) or piece of wood, causing the already stretched skin to split.

At this point, the snake continues to rub its skin on objects, causing the end nearest the head to peel back on itself, until the snake is able to crawl out of its skin, effectively turning the moulted skin inside-out. This is similar to how one might remove a sock from one's foot by grabbing the open end and pulling it over itself. The snake's skin is often left in one piece after the moulting process, including the discarded brille (ocular scale), so that the moult is vital for maintaining the animal's quality of vision. The skins of lizards, in contrast, generally fall off in pieces.

Both frogs and salamanders moult regularly and consume the skin, with some species moulting in pieces and others in one piece.

== In arthropods ==
In arthropods, such as insects, arachnids and crustaceans, moulting is the shedding of the exoskeleton, which is often called its shell, typically to let the organism grow. This process is called ecdysis. Most Arthropoda with soft, flexible skins also undergo ecdysis. Ecdysis permits metamorphosis, the sometimes radical difference between the morphology of successive instars.

A new skin can replace structures, such as by providing new external lenses for eyes. The new exoskeleton is initially soft but hardens after the moulting of the old exoskeleton. The old exoskeleton is called an exuviae. While moulting, insects cannot breathe. In the crustacean Ovalipes catharus moulting must occur before they mate.

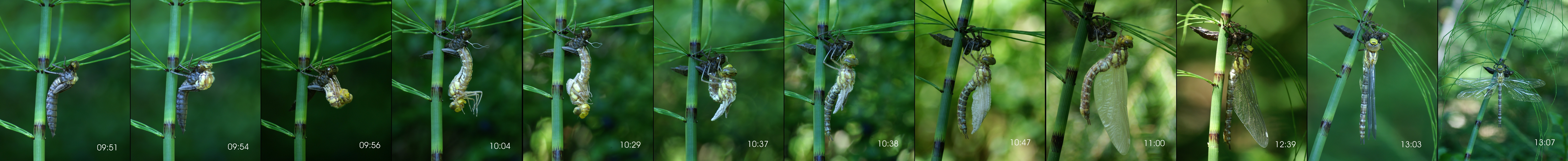
The moulting phase of a southern hawker

== In dogs ==
Most dogs moult twice each year, in the spring and autumn, depending on the breed, environment and temperature. Dogs shedding much more than usual are known as "blow coats" or "blowing coats".

== In guinea pigs, hamsters and rabbits ==
Most guinea pigs moult constantly, whereas hamsters shed less frequently, and rabbits experience seasonal moulting in spring and autumn. The moulting process in small mammals is influenced by seasonality, hormones, and overall health. In hamsters, excessive shedding may indicate stress or disease. A balanced diet and regular grooming are essential for maintaining a healthy coat.

== Gallery ==
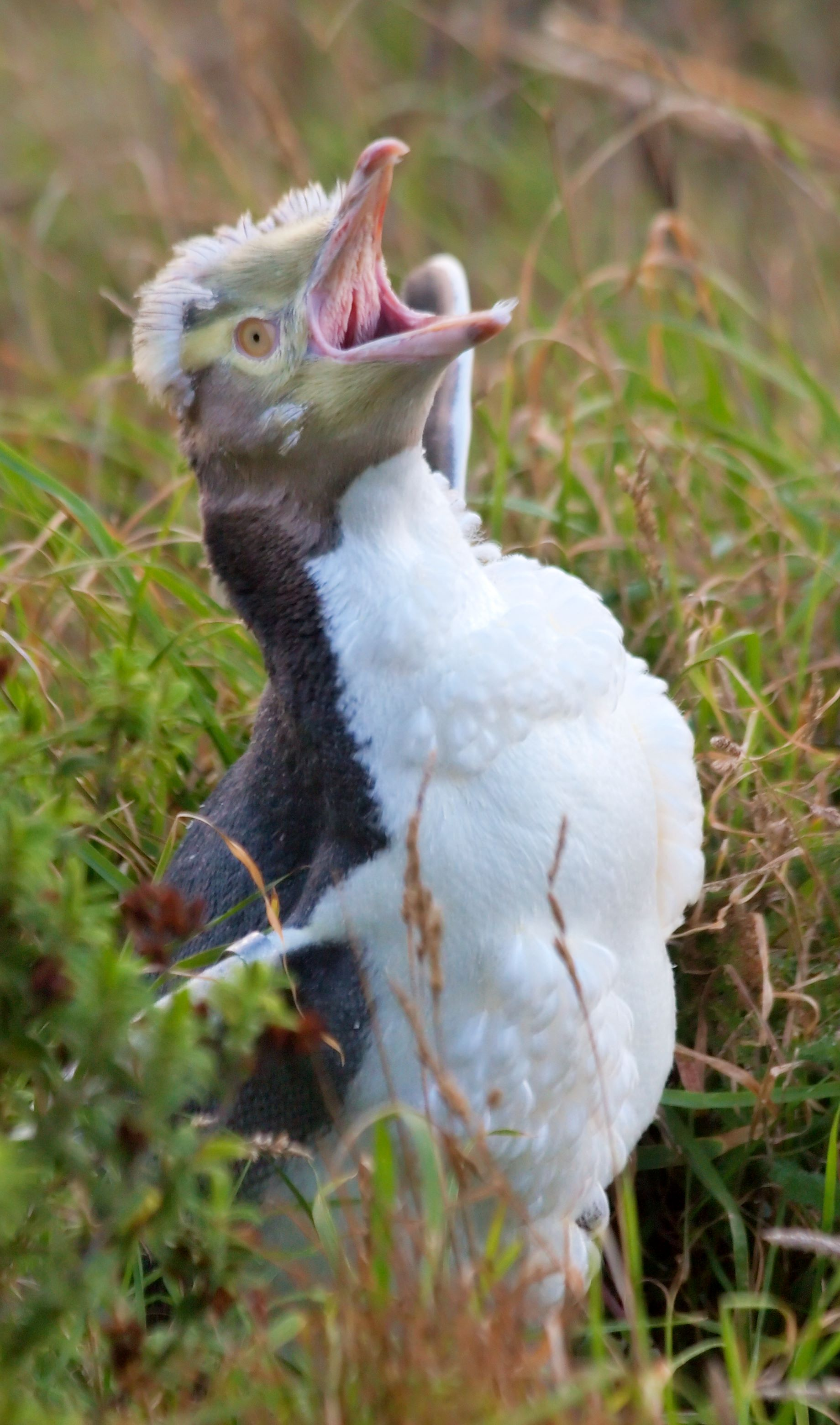
A moulting yellow-eyed penguin

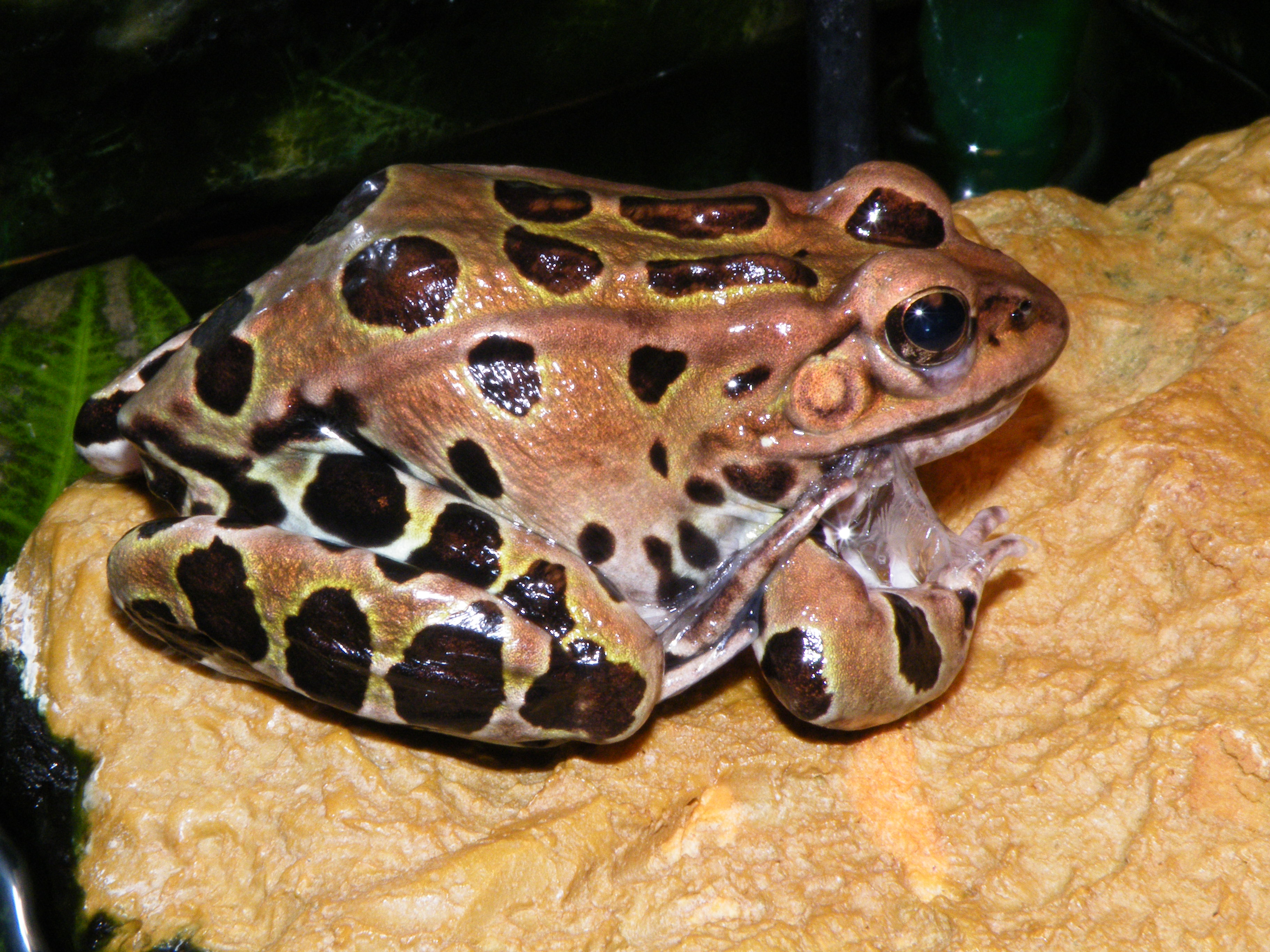
A leopard frog moulting and eating the skin

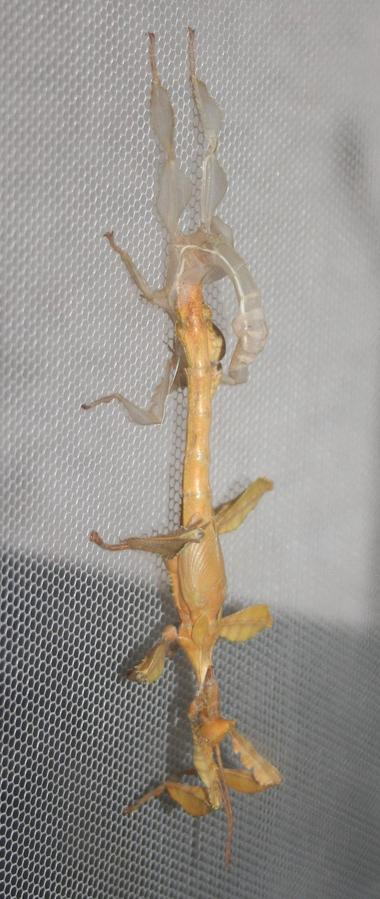
Giant prickly stick insect crawling out of his moulted skin

Moulted snake skin

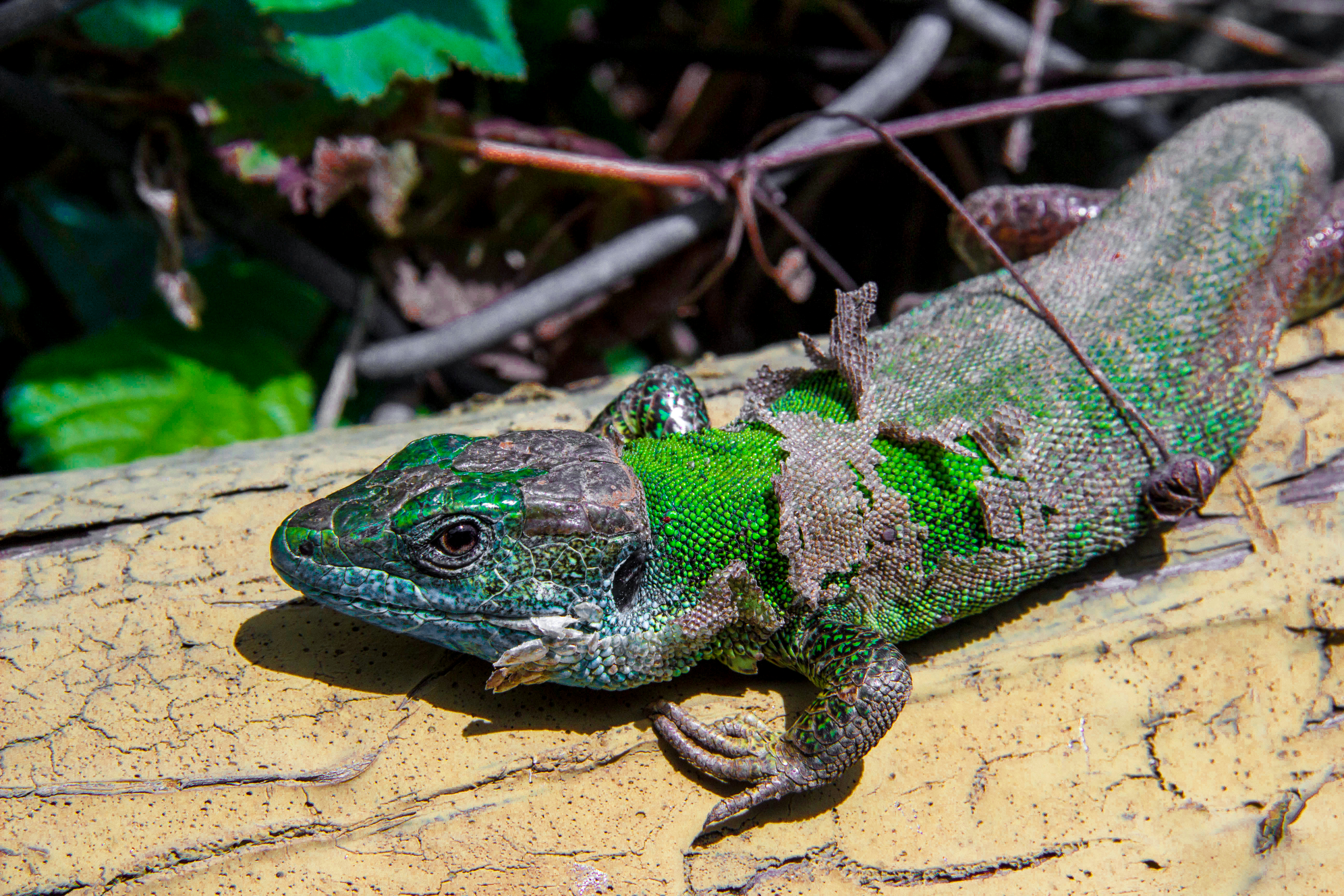
Moulting European green lizard

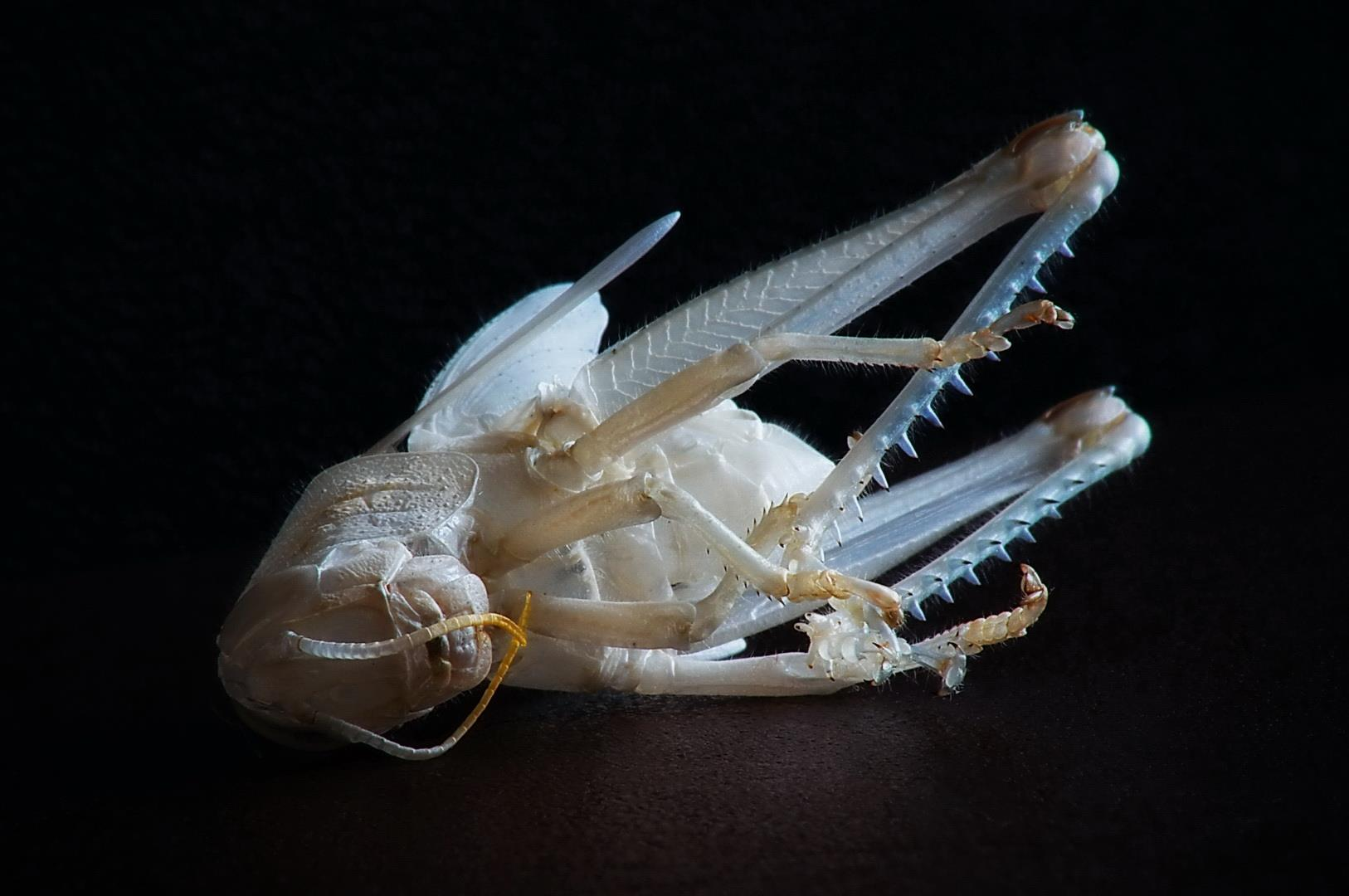
Discarded moult of a grasshopper (Caelifera)

A cicada moulting

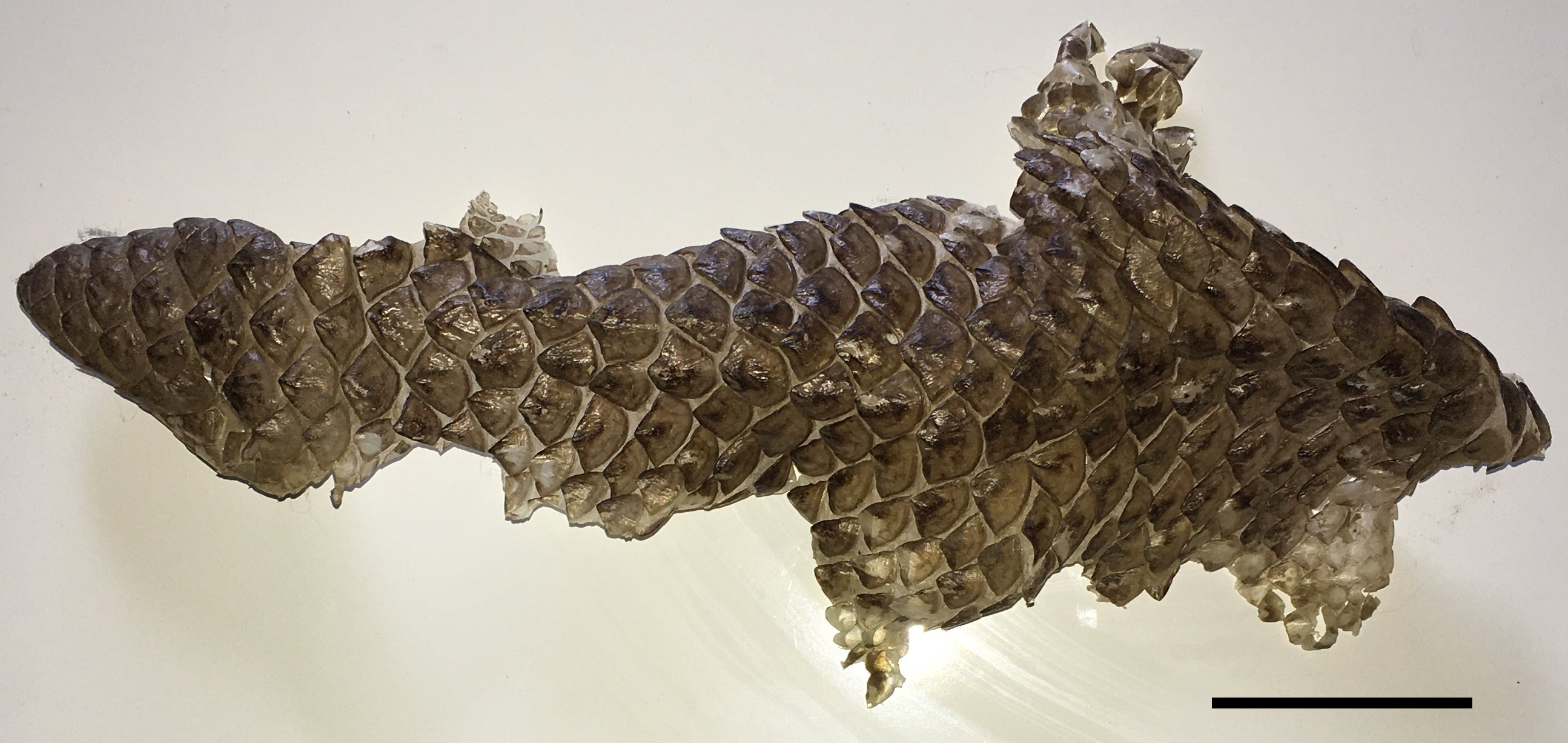
Moult of a Tiliqua rugosa lizard, 5 cm scale bar

== See also ==
- Abscission – a more general term for when an organism sheds parts of itself
