= Ovalipes australiensis =

Scientific classification
- Kingdom: Animalia
- Phylum: Arthropoda
- Clade: Pancrustacea
- Class: Malacostraca
- Order: Decapoda
- Suborder: Pleocyemata
- Infraorder: Brachyura
- Family: Ovalipidae
- Genus: Ovalipes
- Species: O. australiensis

Binomial name
- Ovalipes australiensis Stephenson & Rees, 1968

Species of crab

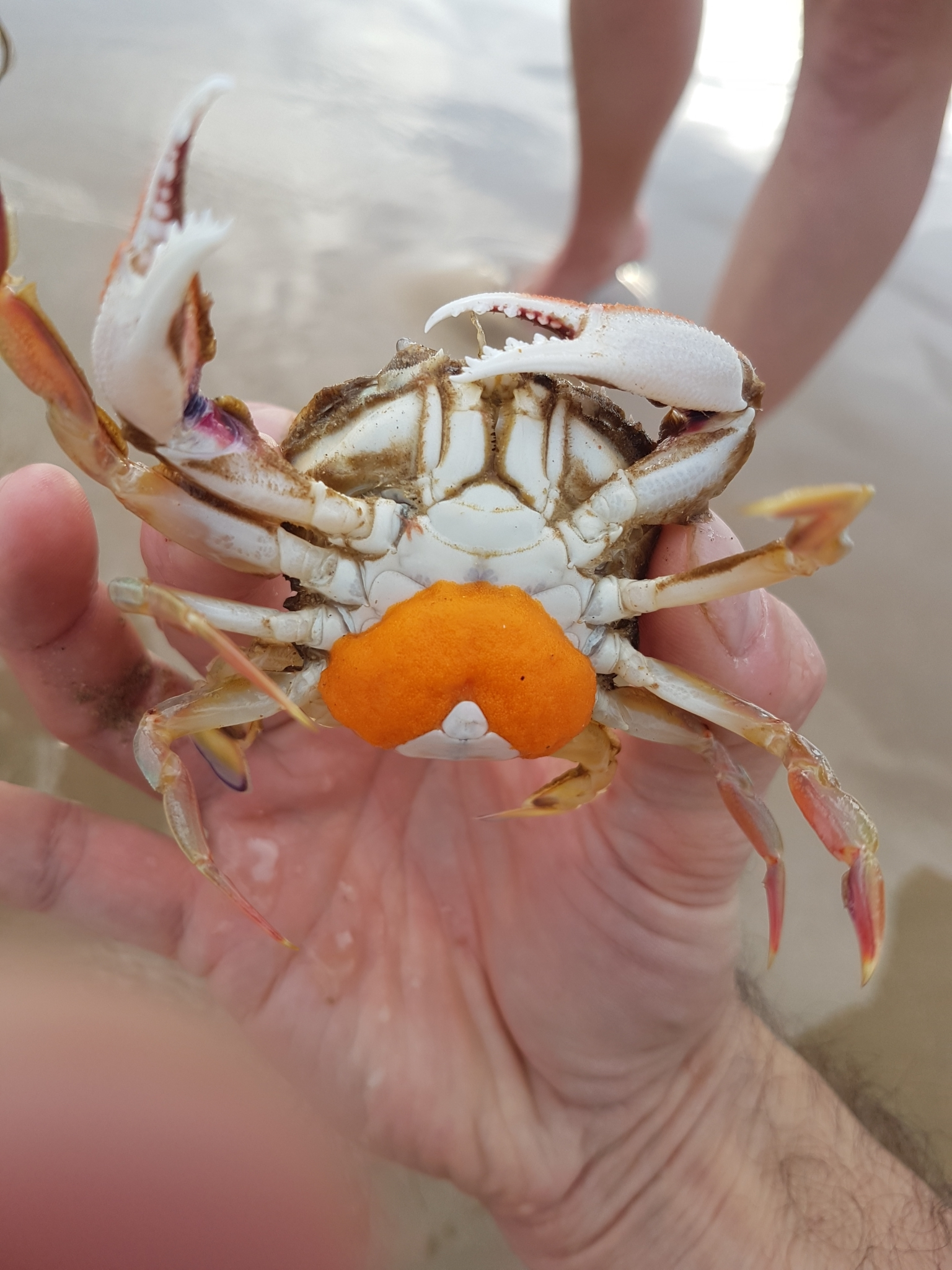
O. australiensis with orange eggs on its abdomen

Ovalipes australiensis, commonly known as the sand crab or the surf crab, is a species of crab in the family Ovalipidae. Its known range extends from Rottnest Island near Perth in Western Australia to just north of Brisbane in Wide Bay, Queensland. It is endemic to southern Australia, and it is present in Tasmania. It is typically found within 100 m (330 ft) from the shore. It is fished commercially, amounting to about 1.5 t (3,300 lb) in 2019, while levels of recreational fishing are negligible.
