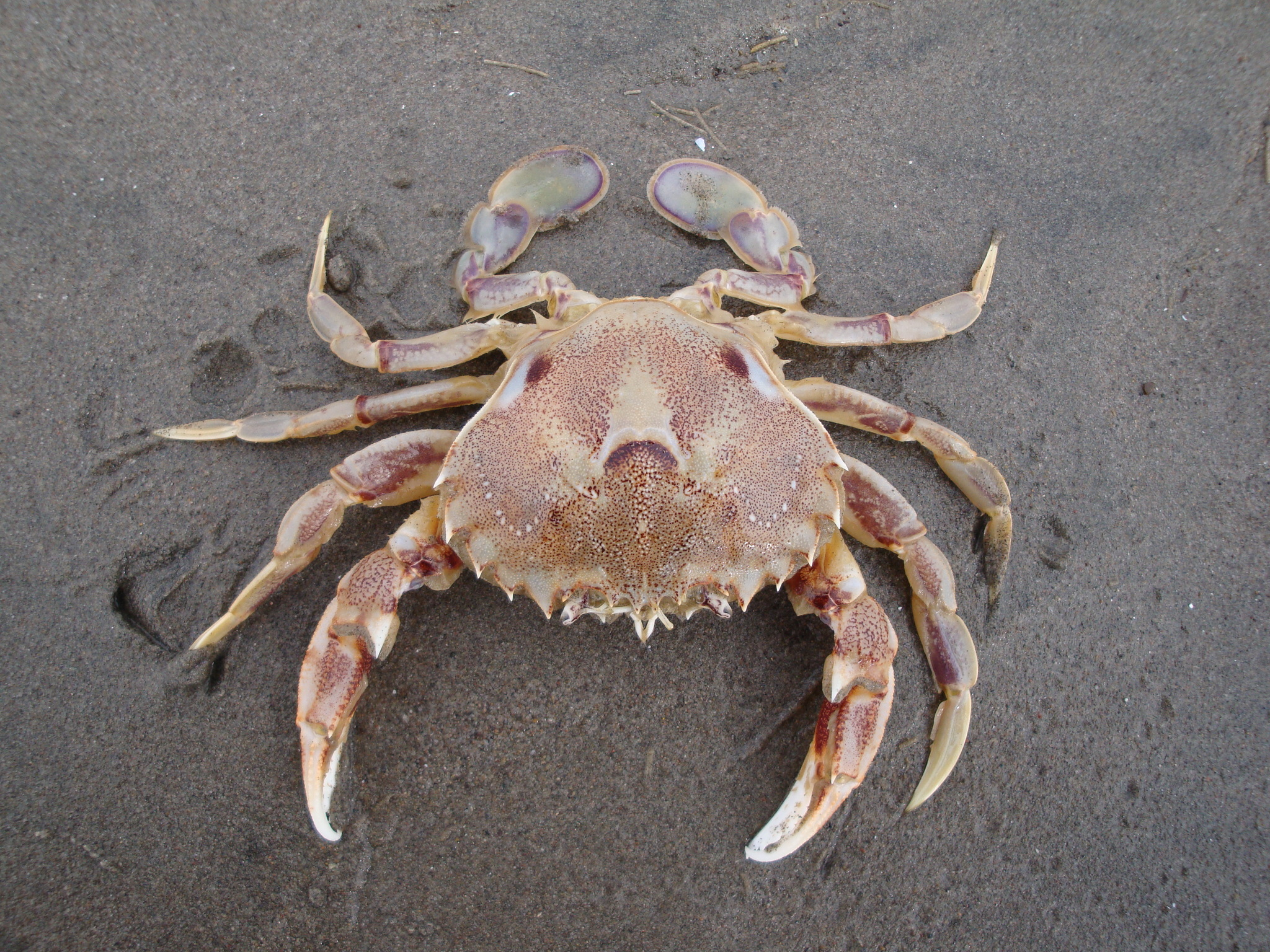

Scientific classification
- Kingdom: Animalia
- Phylum: Arthropoda
- Clade: Pancrustacea
- Class: Malacostraca
- Order: Decapoda
- Suborder: Pleocyemata
- Infraorder: Brachyura
- Family: Ovalipidae
- Genus: Ovalipes
- Species: O. trimaculatus

Binomial name
- Ovalipes trimaculatus (De Haan, 1833)

Synonyms
- Corystes (Anisopus) trimaculatus De Haan, 1833; Platyonychus africanus A. Milne-Edwards, 1861; Platyonychus purpureus Dana, 1852

= Ovalipes trimaculatus =

Species of crab

Ovalipes trimaculatus is a species of crab in the family Ovalipidae.
