= Charles Melbourne Ward =

Australian stage performer, naturalist, historian and marine collector

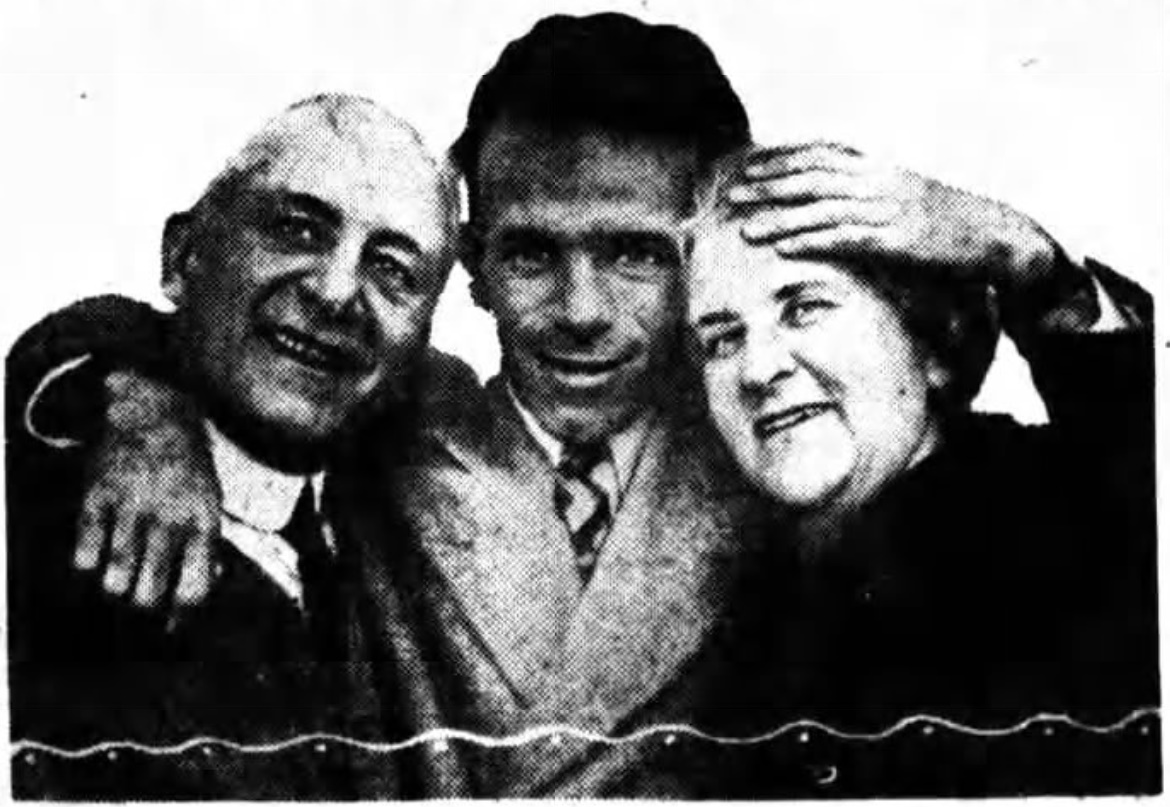
- Charles Melbourne Ward with parents
- Born: 6 October 1903
- Died: 6 October 1966 (aged 63)
- Other name: Mel Ward
- Partner: Halley Kate Ward
- Parents: Hugh Ward (father); Grace, née Miller, Ward (mother)

Charles Melbourne Ward (6 October 1903 – 6 October 1966) was a stage performer, naturalist, historian and marine collector. Although he began as an acrobat and comedian he is best known for his work as a naturalist which included him catching 25,000 crabs from locations all around the world. He didn't use his first name and was generally known as Mel Ward and published under the name Melbourne Ward.

== Early life ==
Ward was born 6 October 1903 in Melbourne to stage actor Hugh Ward and concert singer Grace Ward. Due to travelling with his parents his education was in various locations including New York and Darlinghurst, Sydney. He left school in 1919 to start working on the stage as an acrobat, comedian, dancer and actor starting with The Bing Boys on Broadway, part of The Bing Boys Are Here series of revues. He also played several musical instruments including the clarinet and saxophone.

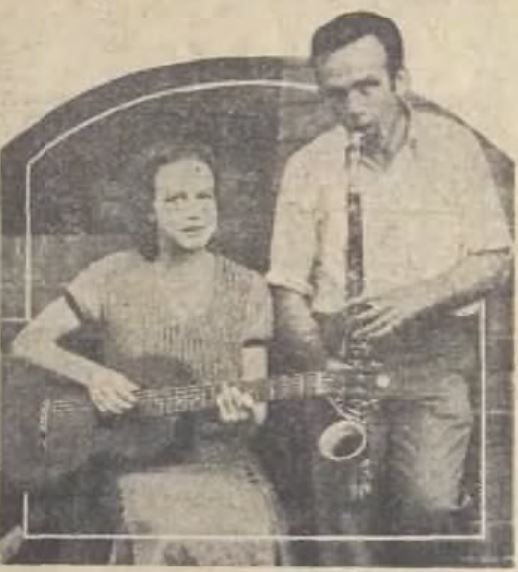
Mel and Halley playing together

He met Halley Kate Foster who was looking for shells, while he was out searching for crabs. He had married Halley on 27 October 1931, and they got a home together in Double Bay. She also was a musician playing strings instruments and they would play together when not working together.

== Naturalist career ==
He gained his interest in nature early on and was very interested in crabs while a young boy. Cleistostoma wardi, now known as Paracleistostoma wardi, that he found on a Queensland beach was named after him in 1926 which led him to quit the stage and take up marine zoology as a career. He started collecting species in Australia and around the world including Samoa, Fiji, Hawaii, Cuba, Panama, Mexico and both coasts of the United States. While in Panama ward discovered 14 species previously unknown to the area. His wife joined him collecting specimens including tours that lasted several months. His collection of several species of fish from the Great Barrier Reef in 1927 was given to the Australian Museum.

He was a fellow of the Zoological Society of London, elected in 1929, a fellow of the Royal Zoological Society of New South Wales in 1936 and made a life-member in 1947. The Australian Museum also appointed his as an honorary zoologist and he was a member of several other societies in Australia.

Ward was one of the marine scientists on the Embury Expeditions to the Great Barrier Reef from 1928 to 1934 where he led scientific excursions and gave lectures to the other members. He was photographed diving in one of the earliest underwater images of the reef.

He made his own diving helmet c. 1930s made from copper, brass, glass, rubber and synthetic seal putty that was used in the film Lovers and Luggers. He also assisted with another pearl diving film that was scrapped before being finished. Ward was also one of the earliest scientist to use underwater cameras.

Several other species have been named in his honor including the small-eyed goby (Austrolethops wardi).

=== Publications ===
Ward published in a number of scientific journals and magazines. Some of his works include:

- The Habits of our Common Shore Crabs (1928) – The Australian Museum Magazine.
- The Crab in Medicine, Magic and Myth. (1937) - The Australian Museum Magazine.
- Primitive Man and His Larder. (1942) - The Australian Museum Magazine.
- Folklore of the Coconut. (1952) - The Australian Museum Magazine.
- Notes on Marine Ecology of Lindeman Island, Queensland, with Special Reference to the Brachyuran Crabs. - The Australian Zoologist.

== Historian interests ==
He also had an interest in the history and culture of Aboriginal Australians collecting both Aboriginal artefacts and books, as well as books about the subject. He opened The Gallery of Natural History and Native Art at the Hydro Majestic Hotel in 1943. On his death his collections were left to the Australian Museum known as the Melbourne Ward Collection.

== Death ==
Ward died 6 October 1966 at his home in Medlow Bath from coronary artery disease and he is buried in the cemetery in Blackheath. His wife halley died after him April 30, 1986.
