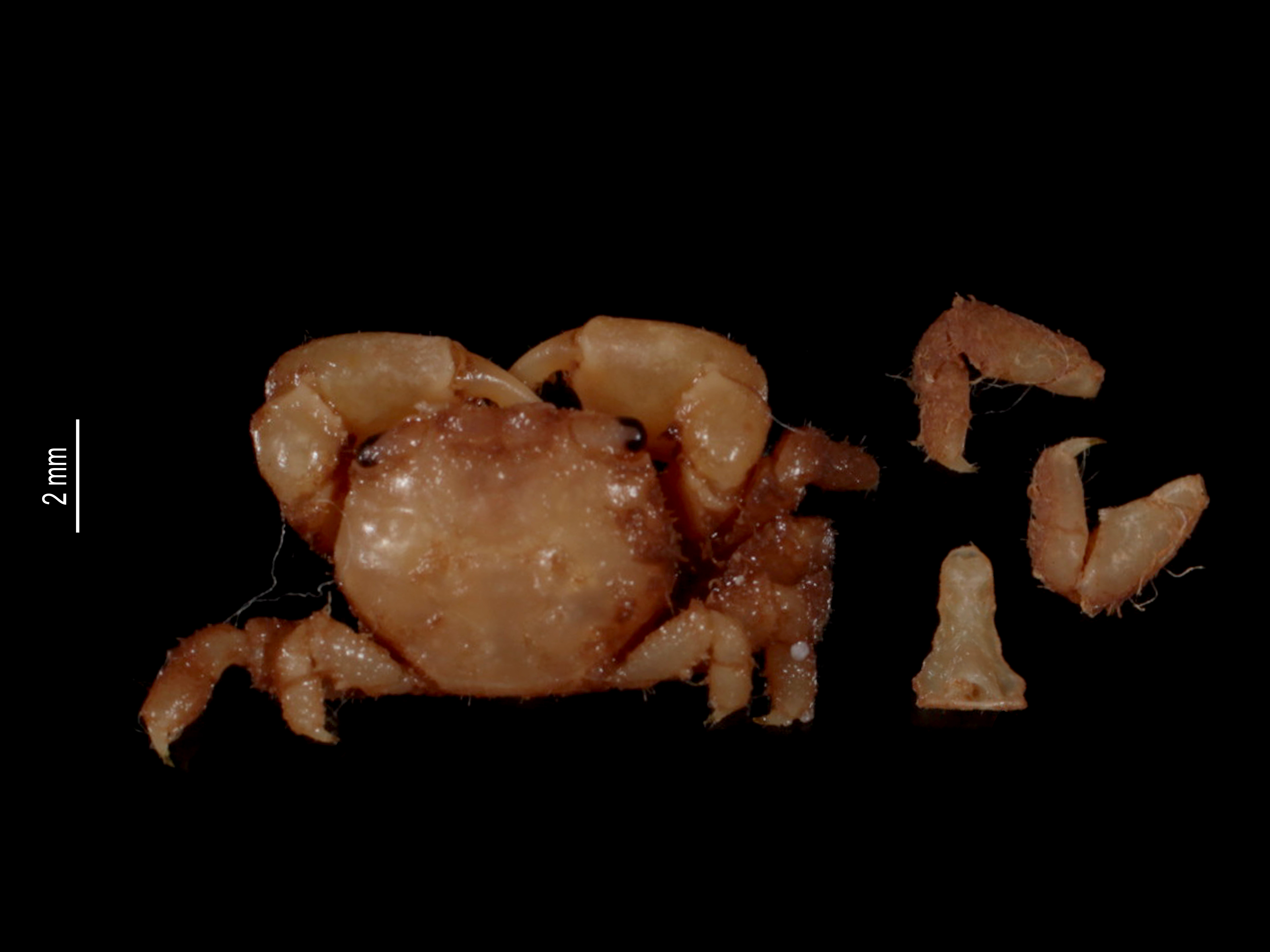
- Baruna trigranulum

Scientific classification
- Kingdom: Animalia
- Phylum: Arthropoda
- Clade: Pancrustacea
- Class: Malacostraca
- Order: Decapoda
- Suborder: Pleocyemata
- Infraorder: Brachyura
- Superfamily: Ocypodoidea
- Family: Camptandriidae; Stimpson

= Camptandriidae =

Family of crabs

The Camptandriidae are a family of crabs, with 38 species in 21 genera:

- Baruna Stebbing, 1904
- Calabarium Manning & Holthuis, 1981
- Camptandrium Stimpson, 1858
- Cleistostoma De Haan, 1833
- Deiratonotus Manning & Holthuis, 1981
- Ecphantor Manning & Holthuis, 1981
- Ilyogynnis Manning & Holthuis, 1981
- Lillyanella Manning & Holthuis, 1981
- Manningis Al-Khayat & Jones, 1996
- Moguai C. G. S. Tan & Ng, 1999
- Mortensenella Rathbun, 1909
- Nanusia C. G. S. Tan & Ng, 1999
- Nasima Manning, 1991
- Paracleistostoma De Man, 1895
- Paratylodiplax Serène, 1974
- Serenella Manning & Holthuis, 1981
- Takedellus C. G. S. Tan & Ng, 1999
- Telmatothrix Manning & Holthuis, 1981
- Tylodiplax De Man, 1895
