= William Stephenson (biologist) =

British/Australian marine biologist and academic

- Born: 14 June 1916; Fencehouses, England
- Died: 26 September 1996 (aged 80)
- Awards: Member of the Order of the British Empire (MBE)

Academic background
- Education: Durham University

Academic work
- Discipline: Biologist

William Stephenson MBE (1916–1996) was a British/Australian marine biologist and academic.

== Early life ==
William Stephenson was born on 14 June 1916 in Fence Houses, Durham, England. His father was a schoolteacher. From the age of 5 he was interested in zoology. He attended Kings College, Durham and took his B.Sc. with honours in zoology in 1938 and received his PhD in zoology from Durham University in 1941. He took a Diploma in Theory and Practice of Teaching at Durham in 1939. He lectured at Kings College, Newcastle and the University of Bristol, under Maurice Yonge. He led students on vacation fieldwork in marine biology at the University College, Bangor and Cullercoats. He also worked as a lecturer and naturalist at the Dove Marine Laboratory in Cullercoats, part of Kings College, Newcastle. He became a full-time naturalist researcher in marine biology in 1947.

== War service ==
Stephenson was involved in non-active service during WW2 with the University Senior Training Corps. He was commissioned in the University of Bristol Senior Training Corps.

== Move to Australia ==
Stephenson accepted a professorial position at the University of Queensland in 1949. He promoted the establishment of marine research stations for the university at North Stradbroke Island in Moreton Bay and Heron Island on the Great Barrier Reef. He retired from the university in 1982. He published over 24 papers, books and reports. From 1956, his research focussed on swimming crabs of the family Portunidae. He was made an Emeritus Professor following his retirement.

== Awards ==
- 1968 Member of the Order of the British Empire (MBE) for services to education
- 1981 Clarke Medal

== Personal life ==
Stephenson died in 1996. He was married to Rita and they had four children, William, Suzan, Alison and Margot.

== Publications ==
Stephenson, W. (1945). Concentration regulation and volume control in Lumbricus terrestris L. Nature, 155 (3943), 635.

Stephenson, W. (1949). Certain effects of agitation upon the release of phosphate from mud. Journal of the Marine Biological Association of the United Kingdom, 28 (2), 371-380.

Stephenson, W. (1952). Faunistic records from Queensland: Part 1 and II. Papers (University of Queensland. Dept. of Zoology). 1(1).

Dall, W., & Stephenson, W. (1953). A bibliography of the marine invertebrates of Queensland. Papers (University of Queensland. Dept. of Zoology). 1(2).

Stephenson, W. (1953). The natural history of Somerset Dam and its fishing potentialities. Ichthyological notes, No. 2.

Stephenson, W. and Wells, J.W. (1956). The corals of Low Isles, Queensland. Papers (University of Queensland. Dept. of Zoology): 1(4).

Stephenson, W., Hudson, Joy J. and Campbell, B. (1957). The Australian portunids (Crustacea: Portunidae). II. The Genus Charybidis. Australian journal of marine and freshwater research, 8(4): 491-507.

Stephenson, W. (1957). Key to the genera of reef building corals of Queensland. Unpublished.

Stephenson, W. (1957). Outdoor studies on living animals in Queensland. St Lucia: University of Queensland Press.

Stephenson, W., & Campbell, B. (1959). The Australian portunids (Crustacea: Portunidae). III. The genus Portunus. Marine and Freshwater Research, 10 (1), 84-123.

Stephenson, W., & Campbell, B. (1960). The Australian portunids (Crustacea: Portunidae). IV. Remaining genera. Australian Journal of Marine and Freshwater Research, 11(1), 73-122.

Stephenson, W., & Searles, R. B. (1960). Experimental Studies on the Ecology of Intertidal Environments at Heron Island. I. Exclusion of Fish from Beach Rock. Marine and Freshwater Research, 11(2), 241-268.

Hailstone, T.S. and Stephenson, W. (1961). The biology of Callianassa (Trypaea) australiensis Dana 1852 (Crustacea, Thalassinidea). Papers (University of Queensland. Dept of Zoology): 1(12).

Stephenson, W. (1961). The Australian portunids (Crustacea: Portunidae). V. Recent collections. Marine and Freshwater Research, 12 (1), 92-128.

Stephenson, W. (1964). Impressions of Universities and Marine Laboratories. BioScience, 14(5), 59-59.

Stephenson, W. and Rees, M. (1965). Ecological and life history studies upon a large foraminferan (Discobetellina biperforata Collins 1958) from Moreton Bay, Queensland. Papers (University of Queensland. Dept. of Zoology) 2(10).

Rees, M., & Stephenson, W. (1966). Some portunids (Crustacea: Portunidae) mostly from Queensland. Proceedings of the Royal Society of Queensland, 78(3), pp. 29–42.

Garth, J. S., & Stephenson, W. (1966). Brachyura of the Pacific coast of America, Brachyrhyncha: Portunidae (No. 1). Los Angeles: Printed for the Allan Hancock Foundation, University of Southern California.

Stephenson, W., & Rees, M. (1967). Portunid crabs (Crustacea: Decapoda: Portunidae) collected by the ‘Discovery’ in the Indian Ocean. Journal of Natural History, 1(2), 285-288.

Stephenson, W., & Rees, M. (1968). The Endeavour and other Australian Museum collections of portunid crabs. Blight.

Stephenson, W., & Rees, M. (1967). Portunid crabs from the International Indian Ocean Expedition in the Smithsonian Collections (Crustacea: Portunidae). Proceedings of the United States National Museum.

Stephenson, W., & Rees, M. A. (1968). A Revision of the Genus Ovalipes Rathbun, 1898 (CRUSTACEA, DECAPODA, PORTUNIDAE). Records of the Australian Museum, 27: 213.

Stephenson, W., & Rees, M. (1968). A revision of the Charybdis miles ‘group’ of species (Crustacea: Portunidae), with description of a new species from Queensland waters. Memoirs of the Queensland Museum, 15(2), 91-109.

Stephenson, W. (1968). The intertidal acorn barnacle Tetraclita vitiate Darwin at Heron Island. University of Queensland Papers. Heron Island Research Station: 1(3).

Stephenson, W., & Williams, W. T. (1968). Numerical approaches to the relationships of certain American swimming crabs (Crustacea: Portunidae). Proceedings of the United States National Museum.

Campbell, B.M. and Stephenson, W. (1970). The Sublittoral brachyura (crustacea: decapoda) of Moreton Bay. Memoirs of the Queensland Museum, 15(4): 235-301.

Stephenson, W., & Cook, S. (1970). New records of portunids from southern Queensland. Memoirs of the Queensland Museum, 15 (4), 331-334.

Stephenson, W. (1970). Places for living: an environmental approach to ecology. Sydney: Angus and Robertson.

Stephenson, W. (1972). The ecological development of man. Sydney: Angus and Robertson.

Stephenson, W. (1972). Portunid crabs from the Indo-West-Pacific and Western America in the Zoological Museum, Copenhagen (Decapoda, Brachyura, Portunidae). Steenstrupia, 2, 127-156.

Stephenson, W. (1972). Zoology. Sydney: Angus and Robertson.

Williams, W.T. and Stephenson, W. (1973). The analysis of three-dimensional data (sites x species x times) in marine ecology. Journal of Experimental Marine Biology and Ecology, 11(3): 207-227.

Stephenson, W., Williams, W.T. and Cook, S.D. (1974). The Benthic fauna of soft bottoms, southern Moreton Bay. Memoirs of the Queensland Museum, 17(1): 73-123.

Clifford, H.T. and Stephenson, W. (1975). An introduction to numerical classification. New York: Academic Press.

Stephenson, W. (1975). Biological results of the snellius expedition: XXVI. The Portunidae (Decapoda-Brachyura) of the snellius expedition (Part II). Zoologische Mededelingen, 49(14), 173-206.

Stephenson, W., Raphael, Y.R. and Cook, S.D. (1976). The Macrobenthos of Bramble Bay, Moreton Bay, Queensland. Memoirs of the Queensland Museum, 17(3): 425-447.

Stephenson, W. (1976). Notes on Indo-West-Pacific Portunids (Decapoda, Portunidae) in the Smithsonian Institution. Crustaceana, 11-26.

Awards
Preceded by Lawrence Alexander Sidney Johnson	Clarke Medal; 1981	Succeeded by Noel Beadle
