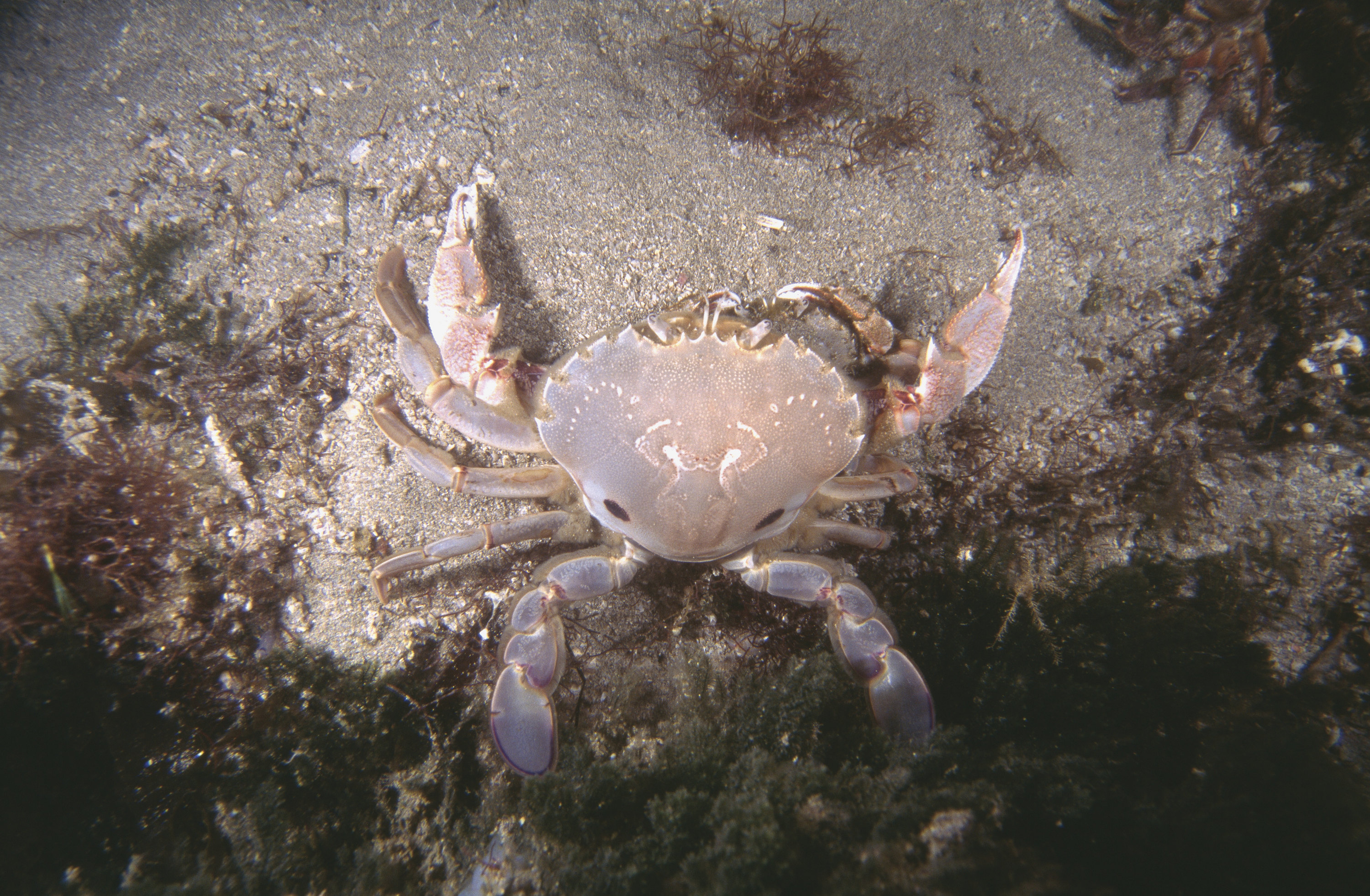
- Ovalipes australiensis

Scientific classification
- Kingdom: Animalia
- Phylum: Arthropoda
- Class: Malacostraca
- Order: Decapoda
- Suborder: Pleocyemata
- Infraorder: Brachyura
- Superfamily: Portunoidea
- Family: Ovalipidae; Spiridonov, Neretina & Schepetov, 2014

= Ovalipidae =

Family of crustaceans

Ovalipidae is a family of crabs in the superfamily Portunoidea. These were formerly members of the family Portunidae. It contains only the genus Ovalipes.
