= Israel Heymann Jonas =

German malacologist (1795-1851)

Israel Heymann Jonas (1795-1851) was a German malacologist. He studied medicine at the Christian-Albrechts-Universität in Kiel, Prussia.

== Species named by Jonas ==
The World Register of Marine Species has 104 records of marine taxa named by Jonas. Most of these names have become synonyms, except:

- Choristodon Jonas, 1844
- Astralium tentoriiforme (Jonas, 1845)
- Bassina pachyphylla (Jonas, 1839)
- Bellastraea aurea (Jonas, 1844)
- Cucullaea granulosa Jonas, 1846
- Filifusus inermis (Jonas, 1846)
- Gafrarium savignyi (Jonas, 1846)
- Haliotis kamtschatkana Jonas, 1845
- Indothais gradata (Jonas, 1846)
- Laemodonta octanfracta (Jonas, 1845)
- Lamelliger distorta (Jonas in Philippi, 1843)
- Lamellolucina dentifera (Jonas, 1846)
- Lanistes purpureus (Jonas, 1839)
- Lutraria maxima Jonas, 1844
- Lutraria rhynchaena Jonas, 1844
- Menathais bimaculata (Jonas, 1845)
- Microcolus dunkeri (Jonas, 1846)
- Mosambicarca erythraeonensis (Jonas in Philippi, 1851)
- Plekocheilus bellulus (Jonas, 1844)
- Plekocheilus euryomphalus (Jonas, 1844)
- Pleuroploca audouini (Jonas, 1846)
- Pleuroploca clava (Jonas, 1846)
- Pleuroploca ponderosa (Jonas, 1850)
- Pleuroploca purpurea (Jonas, 1849)
- Pseudochama corbierei (Jonas, 1846)
- Ropostrum Jonasson & Schröder-Adams, 1996
- Ropostrum amuletum Jonasson & Schröder-Adams, 1996
- Tegillarca bicors (Jonas in Philipp, 1845)
- Tegula euryomphala (Jonas, 1844)
- Tegula melaleucos (Jonas, 1844)
- Tosatrochus attenuatus (Jonas, 1844)
- Turbo magnificus Jonas, 1844
- Vahlkampfia trilaminata Schmoller, Jonas & Ludvik, 1983
- Vasticardium vertebratum (Jonas, 1844)

== Species named in honor of Jonas ==
Hombron & Jacquinot naming a genus Jonas in honor of him; this is a crab genus in the family Corystidae. A number of marine gastropod species use the epithet "jonasii" or jonasi in his honor.

- Arcularia jonasii (Dunker, 1846): synonym of Nassarius jonasii Dunker, 1846
- Baseodiscus jonasii Strand, Hjelmgren & Sundberg, 2005
- Buccinum jonasii Dunker, 1846: synonym of Nassarius jonasii Dunker, 1846
- Nassa jonasii (Dunker, 1846): synonym of Nassarius jonasii Dunker, 1846
- Nassarius jonasii Dunker, 1846
- Parcanassa jonasii (Dunker, 1846): synonym of Nassarius jonasii Dunker, 1846
- Siphonaria jonasi Dunker, 1853: synonym of Siphonaria pectinata (Linnaeus, 1758)

== Publications ==
Jonas sometimes also published as "J." H. Jonas.

He studied, together with Wilhelm Dunker, the "Museum Gruneri", a large collection of species in the bivalve family Pteriidae. This study was published as Verzeichniß der Conchyliensammlung des verstorbenen Herrn Consul Gruner, welche im Ganzen verkauft werden soll von Bunsen Hausschild 1857. Bremer Druck 1857.

In 1846 Jonas described the "Rodatz collection". Rodatz collected many mollusks during a number of commercial expeditions from Germany to Zanzibar and West Africa in the period of 1843–51, and from the Red Sea in 1845. He had offered his specimens to Naturhistorisches Museum Hamburg.
