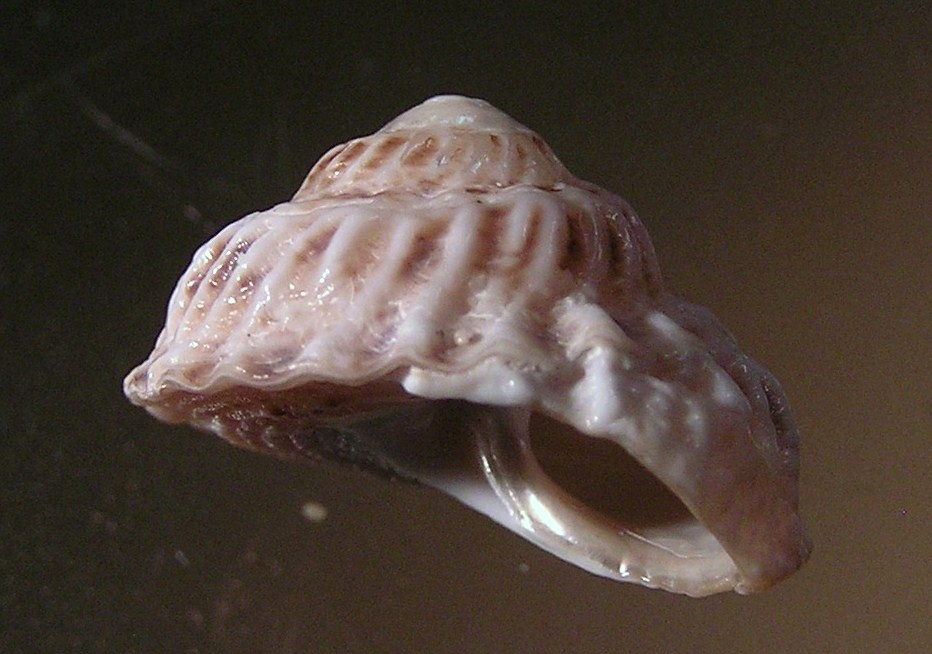
- Bellastraea squamifera

Scientific classification
- Kingdom: Animalia
- Phylum: Mollusca
- Class: Gastropoda
- Subclass: Vetigastropoda
- Order: Trochida
- Superfamily: Trochoidea
- Family: Turbinidae
- Genus: Bellastraea; Iredale, 1924

Type species
- Bellastraea kesteveni Iredale, 1924

Synonyms
- Micrastraea Cotton, 1939

= Bellastraea =

Genus of gastropods

Bellastraea is a genus of sea snails, marine gastropod mollusks in the family Turbinidae, the turban snails.

The Australian Faunal Directory considers this genus as a synonym of Astralium Link, 1807

== Species ==
Species within the genus Bellastraea include:

- Bellastraea aurea (Jonas, 1844)
- Bellastraea rutidoloma (Tate, 1893)
- Bellastraea squamifera (Koch, 1844)

Species brought into synonymy

- Astraea kesteveni T. Iredale, 1924: synonym of Bellastraea squamifera (Koch, 1844)
- Bellastraea kesteveni (Iredale, 1924): synonym of Bellastraea squamifera (Koch, 1844)
- Bellastraea urvillei Philippi, R.A., 1852: synonym of Astralium tentoriiforme (Jonas, J.H., 1845)
