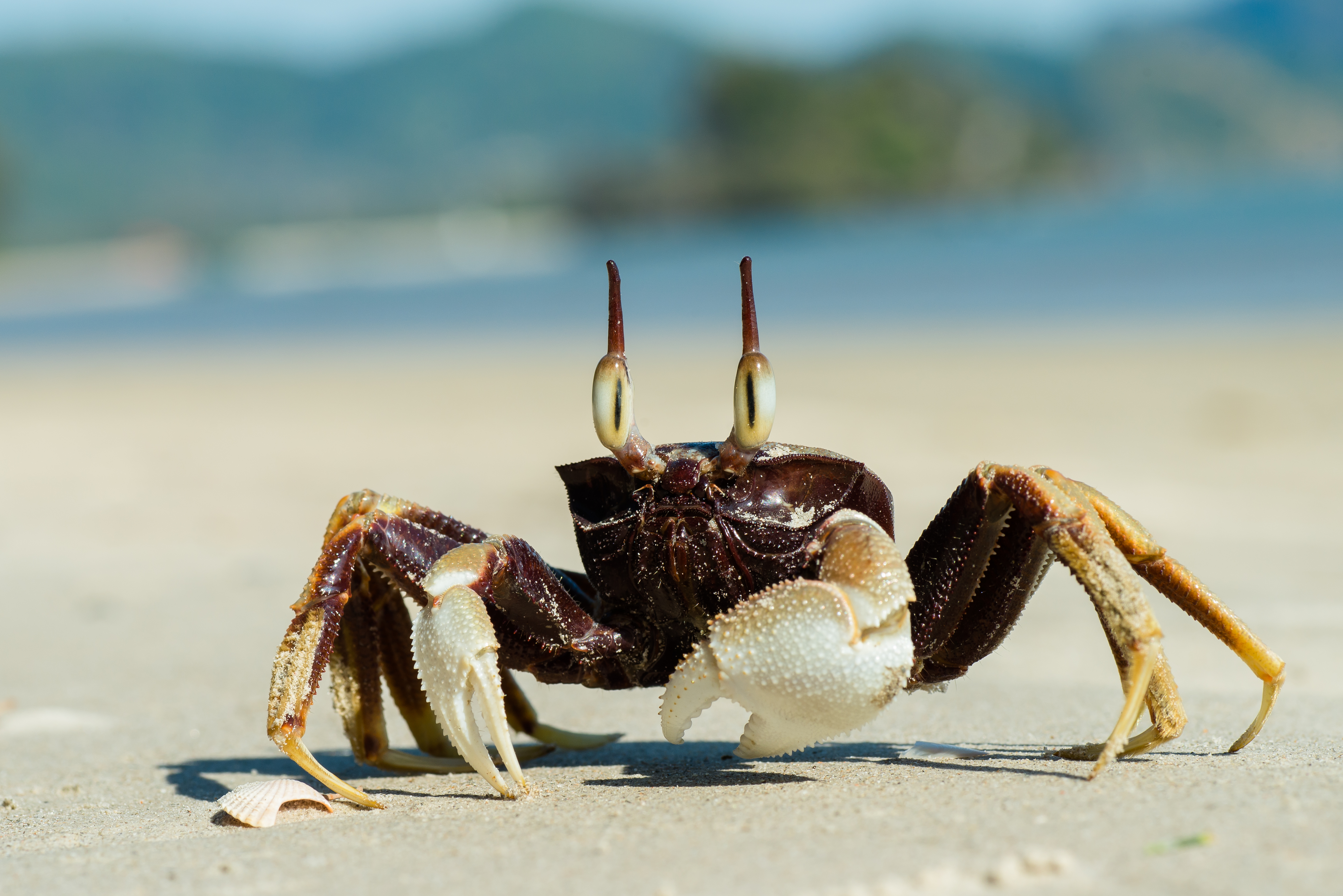
- Horned ghost crab (Ocypode ceratophthalmus) in Krabi, Thailand

Scientific classification
- Kingdom: Animalia
- Phylum: Arthropoda
- Clade: Pancrustacea
- Class: Malacostraca
- Order: Decapoda
- Suborder: Pleocyemata
- Infraorder: Brachyura
- Family: Ocypodidae
- Subfamily: Ocypodinae; Rafinesque, 1815

Type genus
- Ocypode Weber, 1795

Genera
- Ocypode Weber, 1795; Hoplocypode Sakai &Türkay, 2013

= Ghost crab =

Ghost crabs

Subfamily of crustaceans

Ghost crabs are semiterrestrial crabs of the subfamily Ocypodinae, from Ancient Greek ὠκύς (okús), meaning "swift", and πούς (poús), meaning "foot". They are common shore crabs in tropical and subtropical regions throughout the world, inhabiting deep burrows in the intertidal zone. They are generalist scavengers and predators of small animals. The name "ghost crab" derives from their nocturnality and their generally pale coloration. They are also sometimes called sand crabs, though the name refers to various other crabs that do not belong to the subfamily.

Characteristics of the subfamily include one claw being larger than the other, thick and elongated eyestalks, and a box-like body. The differences in claw sizes, however, are not as marked as in male fiddler crabs. The subfamily includes 22 species in two genera.

== Taxonomy ==
Ocypodinae is one of two subfamilies in the family Ocypodidae, the other being the fiddler crab subfamily, Ucinae. Both subfamilies have members in which one of the claw-bearing legs (the chelipeds) is much larger than the other. However, only male fiddler crabs exhibit this, while both male and female ghost crabs have unequally sized claws. The difference is also much more pronounced among fiddler crab males. The fiddler crabs' carapaces are broadened at the front, while the carapaces of ghost crabs are more or less box-like. Lastly, the eyes of ghost crabs have large and elongated eyestalks, with the corneas occupying the entire lower part, while in fiddler crabs the eyestalks are long and thin, with the corneas small and located at the tip.

Ocypodinae was previously regarded as monotypic, with only one genus, Ocypode, classified under it. In 2013, though, Katsushi Sakai and Michael Türkay reclassified the gulf ghost crab into a separate genus, Hoplocypode based on the differences of their gonopods (appendages modified into copulatory organs) from that of the rest of the members of the genus Ocypode.

=== Genera ===
The subfamily Ocypodinae currently contains 22 species in these two genera:

- Ocypode Weber, 1795
- Hoplocypode Sakai &Türkay, 2013

== Description ==
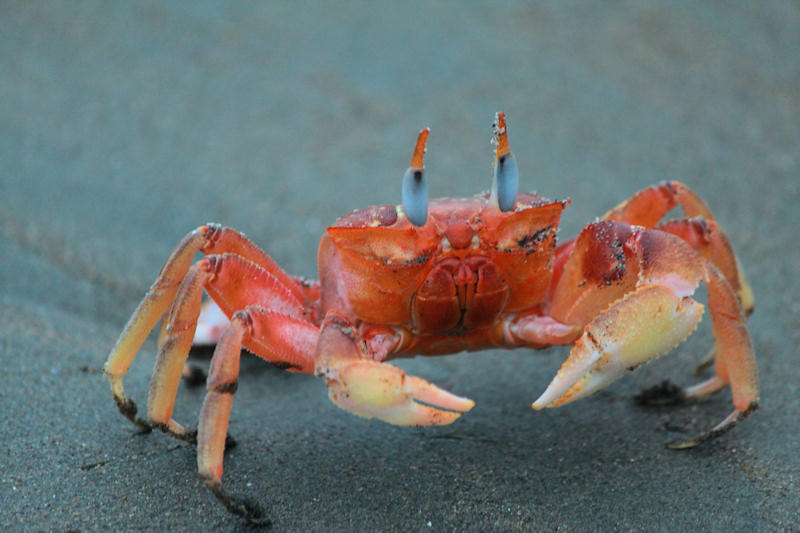
Exophthalmy in the painted ghost crab (Ocypode gaudichaudii)

Most ghost crabs have pale-colored bodies that blend in well with the sand, though they are capable of gradually changing body coloration to match their environments and the time of day. Some species are brightly colored, such as Ocypode gaudichaudii and Ocypode ryderi.

Ghost crabs have elongated and swollen eyestalks with very large corneas on the bottom half. Their carapaces are deep and box-like, squarish when viewed from the top with straight or slightly curving sides. The regions of the carapace are usually not clearly defined. The "whip" of their antennules (antennular flagella) are small or rudimentary. They fold back into the body diagonally or almost vertically. The plate between them (the interantennular septum) is broad. The third pair of mouth appendages (maxillipeds) completely cover the mouth opening. A small orifice with edges thickly fringed with hair is found between the bases of the second and third pairs of walking legs.

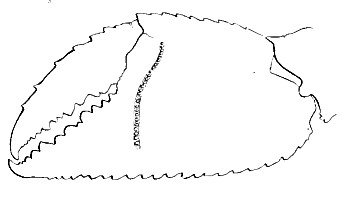
Stridulating (sound-producing) ridge on the larger claw of Ocypode brevicornis

Ghost crab species can be most reliably identified by means of the area where they were recovered, the presence of "horns" (styles) on their eyestalks (exophthalmy), the pattern of stridulating (sound-producing) ridges on the inside surface of the palms of their larger claws, and the shape of the gonopods in males.

Exophthalmy is exhibited by seven species in the subfamily: Ocypode brevicornis, Ocypode ceratophthalma, Ocypode gaudichaudii, Ocypode macrocera, Ocypode mortoni, Ocypode rotundata, and Ocypode saratan. All of them are found in the Indo-Pacific region with more or less limited ranges, with the exception of Ocypode ceratophthalma, which is found widely. Ocypode cursor, found in the Atlantic Ocean and the Mediterranean Sea, also possesses a tuft of bristles at the end of its eyestalks.

Stridulating ridges also differ from species to species, with some displaying rows of tubercles, others displaying rows of smaller ridges (striae), or a combination of both. These are very important in identifying species as they are displayed by both adults and juveniles (though they may be absent in newly regenerated claws). They are used by ghost crabs for communication.

Both exophthalmy and stridulating ridges, however, can not be reliably used to determine phylogenetic relationships between different species of ghost crabs. Sakai & Türkay (2013) regarded the shape of the gonopods as more suited for this. As gonopods are important in sexual reproduction, they are less likely to evolve randomly in response to the environment. Ghost crabs of the genus Hoplocypode can be distinguished from those in Ocypode by examining their gonopods. In the former, the first gonopod has a complex, hoof-shaped tip, while in the latter they are simple and curved.

== Ecology ==
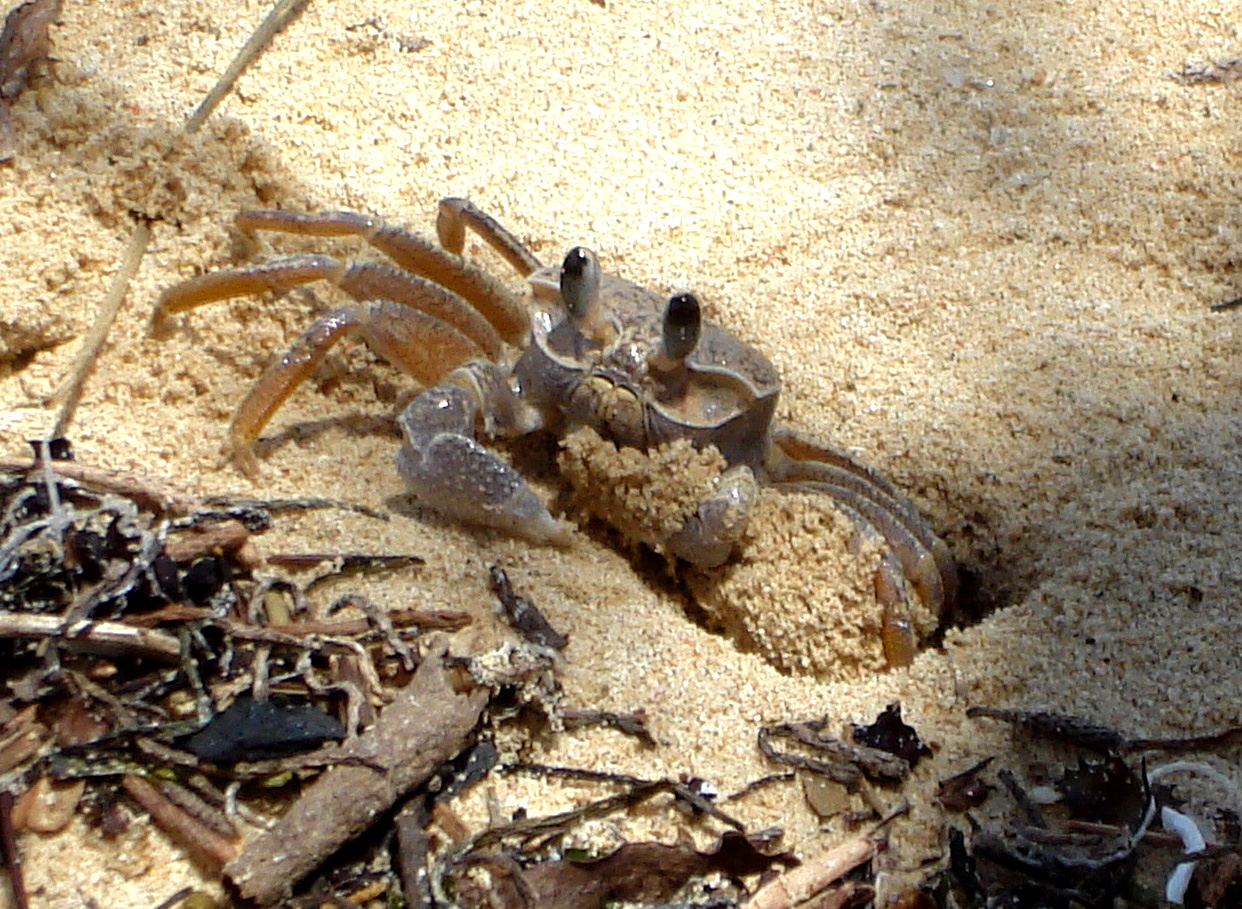
Ocypode madagascariensis digging a burrow

Ghost crabs dig deep burrows near the intertidal zone of open sandy beaches. The burrows are usually composed of a long shaft with a chamber at the end, occasionally with a second entrance shaft. They are semi-terrestrial and breathe oxygen from the air through moistened gills. They must periodically wet their gills with seawater, usually by taking water from moist sand or by running into the surf and letting the waves wash over them. However, they can only remain under water for a limited amount of time, as they will drown.

Ghost crabs are generalists, scavenging carrion and debris, as well as preying on small animals, including sea turtle eggs and hatchlings, clams, and other crabs. They are predominantly nocturnal. They remain in their burrows during the hottest part of the day, and throughout the coldest part of the winter.

Ghost crabs are swift runners, darting away at the slightest sign of danger. They either head back to their burrows or into the sea to escape intruders. The gaits of ghost crabs alter as their speed increases. Observations on O. ceratophthalma show it can walk indefinitely using all four pairs of walking legs, occasionally alternating which side leads. At higher speeds, the fourth pair of legs is raised off the ground, and at the highest speeds, the crab runs, using only the first and second pairs of walking legs.

Ghost crabs utilize a varied animal acoustic communication system. They can create different sounds by striking the ground with their claws, rubbing their claws together to make a rasping sound, rubbing their legs to make a bubbly noise, and rubbing the teeth inside their stomachs to make a growling sound. The lateral teeth of the gastric mill possess a series of comb-like structures that rub against the median tooth to produce stimulation with dominant frequencies below 2 kHz.

Ghost crabs also have the ability to change colors to match their surroundings by adjusting the concentration and dispersal of pigments within their chromatophores. They can even match the specific colors of the grains of sand in their habitats. However, unlike metachrosis (which is a rapid change of colors), ghost crabs are only capable of morphological color change, which occurs over a longer span of time.

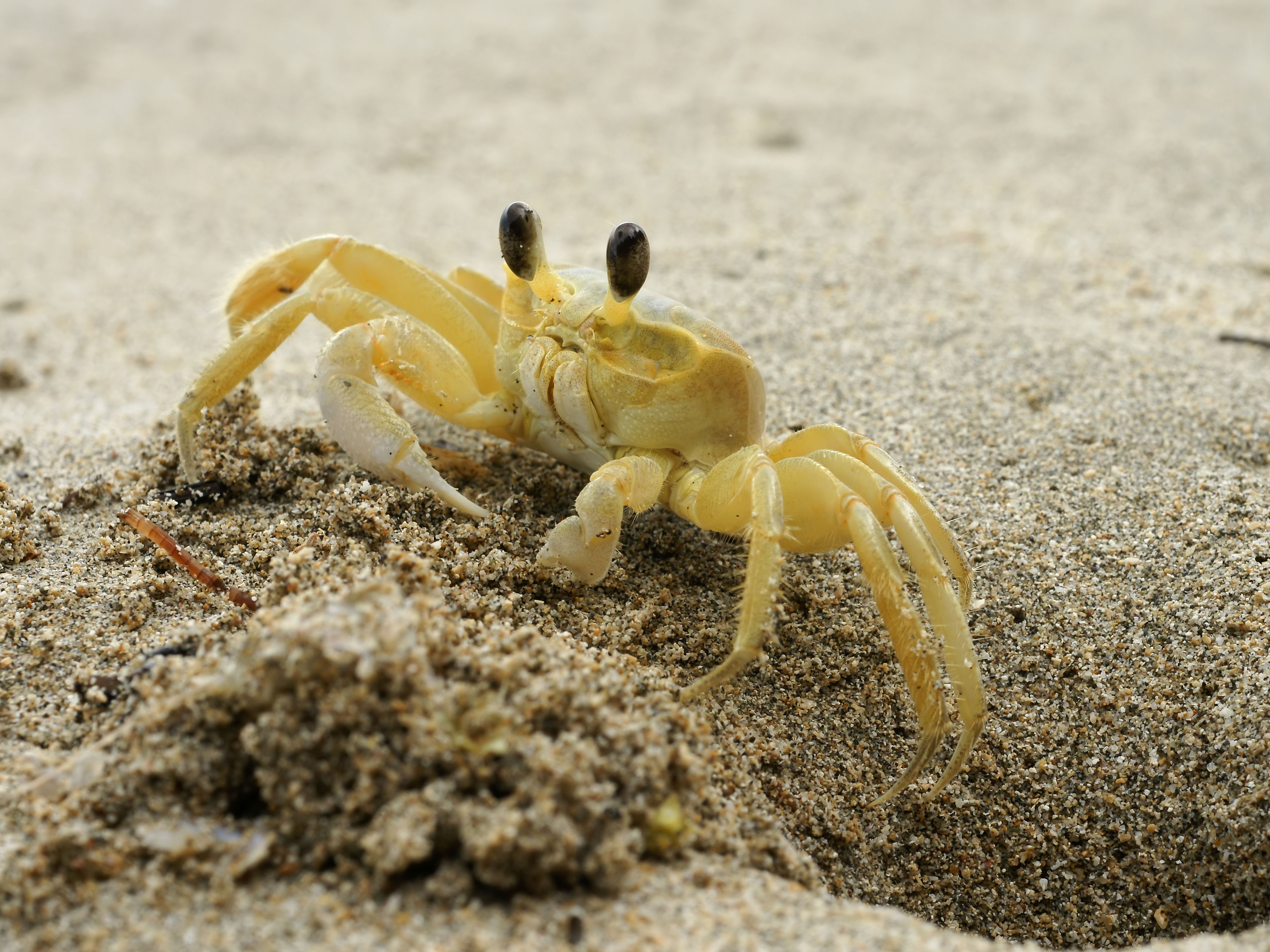
Atlantic ghost crab (Ocypode quadrata) emerging from its burrow in Cahuita, Costa Rica

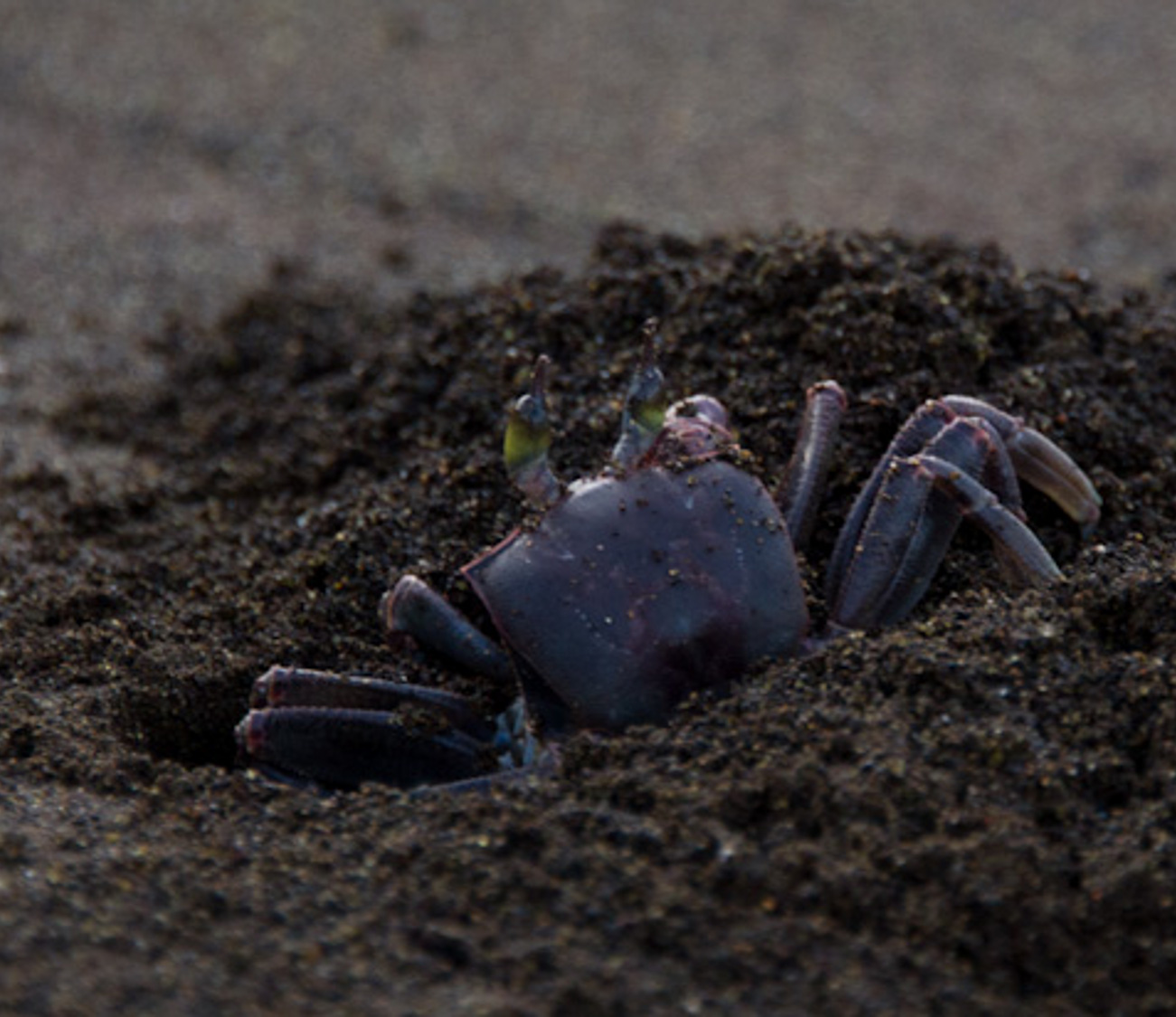
Horned ghost crab (Ocypode ceratophthalma) from a black sand beach in Kauai

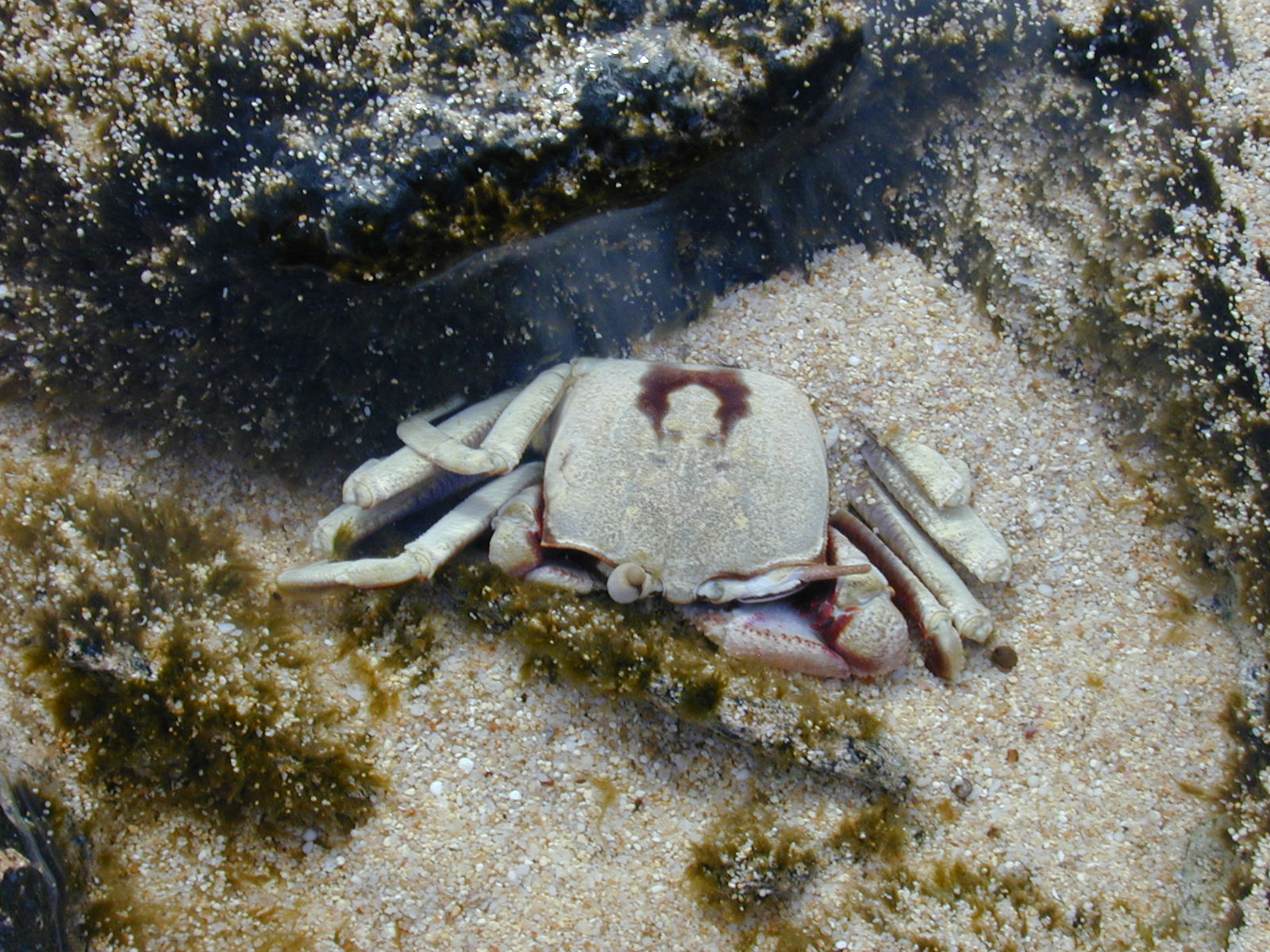
White sand beach in Kahoolawe, Hawaii

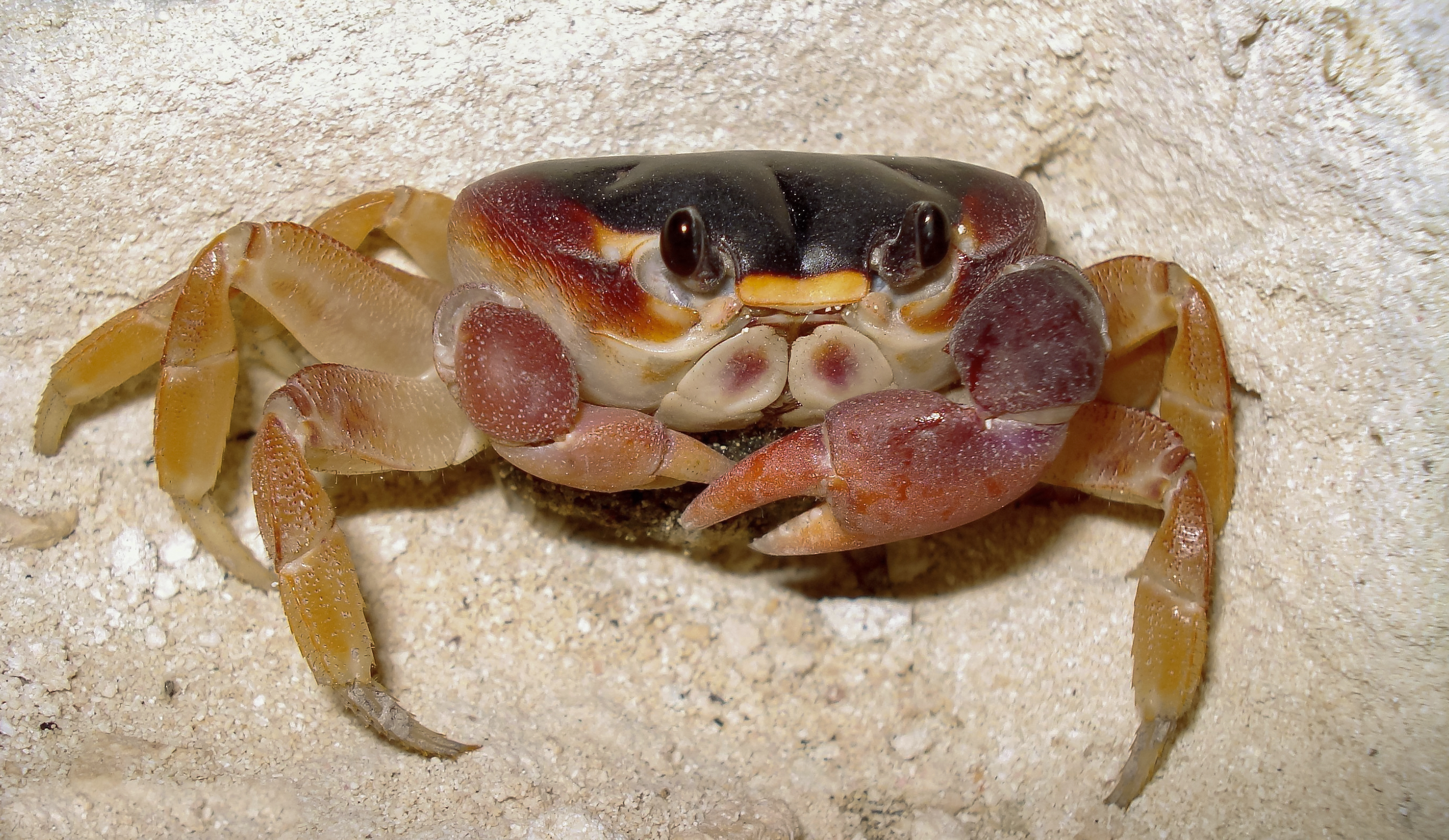
Sand Crab carrying eggs in Cancún Mexico (Ocypodidae)

In a study in 1964, individuals of O. ceratophthalma in Hawaii from two populations (one from a black-sand beach and the other from a white-sand beach) were observed to markedly differ in pigmentation although they remain morphologically indistinguishable. Specimens taken from the black-sand beach were much darker than the specimens taken from the white-sand beach, exhibiting nearly 12 times as many black chromatophores. When the black-sand specimens were subsequently exposed to a white background, they were observed to gradually become lighter over the course of about a month. The opposite happened to white-sand specimens when placed in black backgrounds.

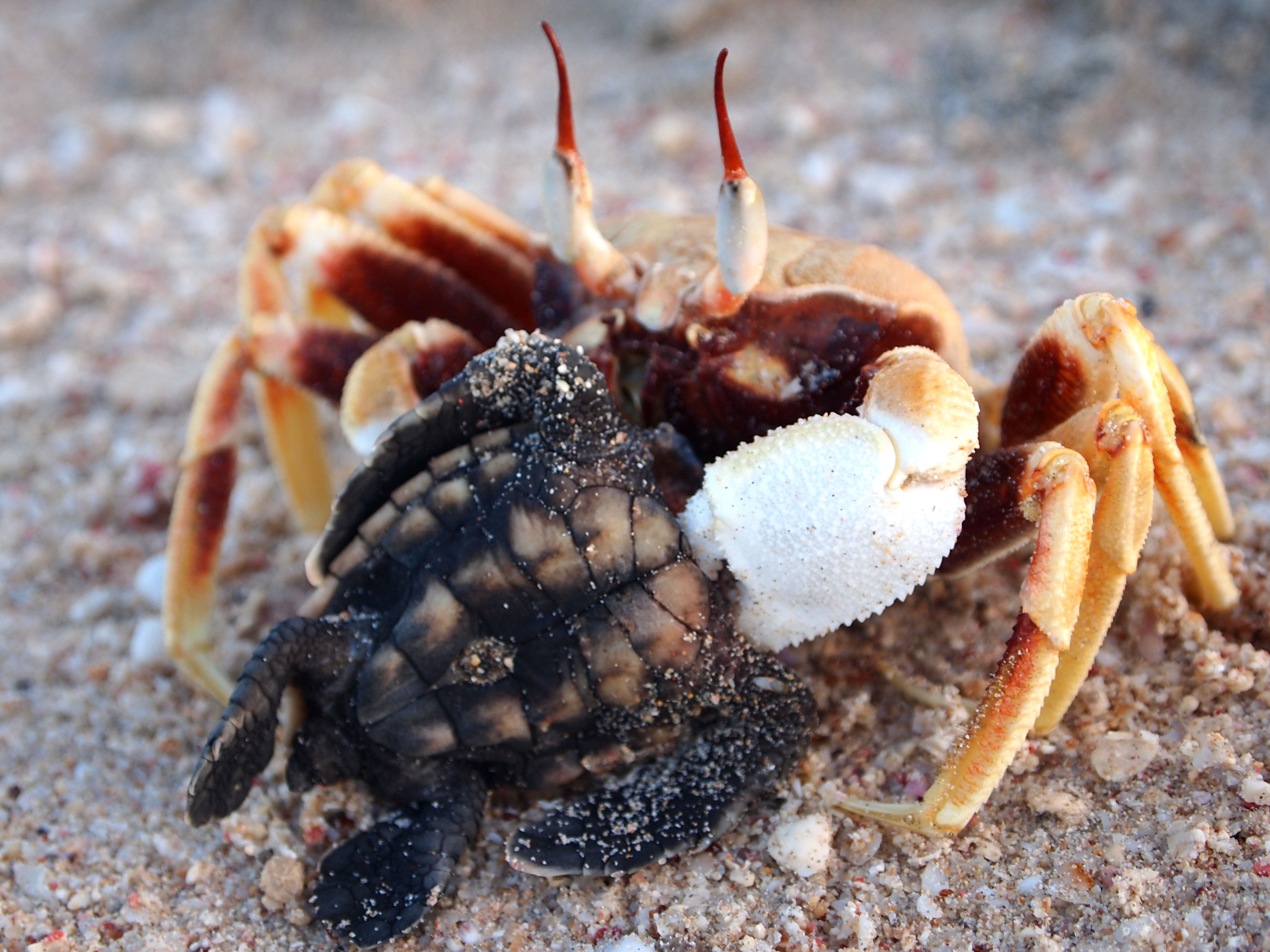
A horned ghost crab (Ocypode ceratophthalma) preying on a loggerhead hatchling in Gnaraloo, Western Australia. Ghost crabs are one of the chief causes of egg and hatchling mortality in sea turtles.

In a 2013 study in Singapore, Ocypode ceratophthalma was also discovered to change color in response to the time of day. In a span of 24 hours, they were observed to alternate between lighter and darker coloration, being lightest at midday and darkest at night. However, when placed in a dark background, the crabs showed no significant changes in coloration. This suggests, at least for short-term color changes, they follow a day-night cycle to determine body coloration; basing it on their biological clocks rather than on the brightness or darkness of their environments. The researchers believe relying on the time of day rather than ambient light is more advantageous for survival in ghost crabs. It lets ghost crabs avoid changing color when in temporary shadow (for example within their burrows) and thus still remain inconspicuous when they are once again illuminated by daylight. However, this behavior is only exhibited by juveniles.

Ghost crabs lay their eggs in the sea, which develop into planktonic marine larvae.

== Distribution ==
Ghost crabs dominate sandy shores in tropical and subtropical regions of the world, replacing the sandhoppers that predominate in cooler areas. Three species are found in the Atlantic Ocean and the Mediterranean Sea, and two occur in the eastern Pacific coast of the Americas. The rest of the species are found in the western Pacific and the Indian Ocean to the tip of southern Africa.

== Conservation ==
Ghost crabs are negatively affected by human activity on sandy beaches, such as sand trampling by foot traffic, the building of seawalls, or the presence of inorganic pollutants. Due to their worldwide distribution and the ease by which their burrows can be surveyed, ghost crab burrows are regarded as valuable ecological indicators for quickly assessing the impact of human disturbance on beach habitats.

== See also ==
- Heloecius - the semaphore crab
