= Jonas indicus =

Scientific classification
- Domain: Eukaryota
- Kingdom: Animalia
- Phylum: Arthropoda
- Class: Malacostraca
- Order: Decapoda
- Suborder: Pleocyemata
- Infraorder: Brachyura
- Family: Corystidae
- Genus: Jonas
- Species: J. indicus

Binomial name
- Jonas indicus Chopra, 1935

Species of crab

Jonas indicus is a species of crab in the family Corystidae.
