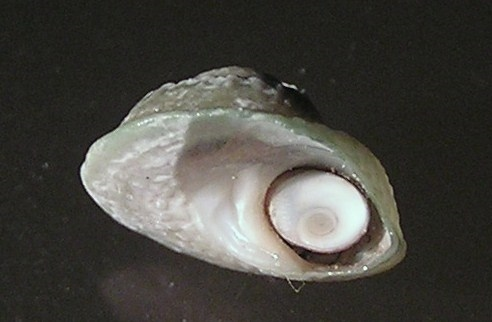
- Apertural view of a shell of Bellastraea aurea

Scientific classification
- Kingdom: Animalia
- Phylum: Mollusca
- Class: Gastropoda
- Subclass: Vetigastropoda
- Order: Trochida
- Family: Turbinidae
- Genus: Bellastraea
- Species: B. aurea

Binomial name
- Bellastraea aurea (Jonas, 1844)

Synonyms
- Astralium aureum (Jonas, 1844); Carinidae granulata Swainson, 1855; Carinidae ornata Tenison-Woods, 1876; Carinidae tasmanica Tenison-Woods, 1877; Micrastraea aurea Iredale, T. & McMichael, D.F. 1962; Trochus aurea Jonas, 1844 (original combination); Trochus aureus Jonas, 1844

= Bellastraea aurea =

Species of gastropod

Bellastraea aurea, common name the golden small star, is a species of sea snail, a marine gastropod mollusk in the family Turbinidae, the turban snails.

== Description ==
The height of the shell varies between 10 mm and 14 mm, its diameter between 12 mm and 19 mm. The small, solid, imperforate shell has a depressed-conic shape. Its color pattern is golden yellow or olive. The spire is low-conic and contains five whorls. These are scarcely convex above, and plicate at the sutures. The folds become fainter and frequently, bifurcating toward the periphery. The whorls are spirally lirate, the lirae below rather coarse, beaded, above finer, cutting the folds more or less into granules. The body whorl generally descends toward the aperture, and is compressed toward the periphery, which is subangular except in large specimens. The oblique aperture is rather small and is pearly white. The columellar callus is dilated over the umbilical region, and excavated there, and with an indistinct denticle near its base.

== Distribution ==
This marine species is endemic to Australia and occurs in the shallow subtidal zone off South Australia, Tasmania, Victoria and Western Australia.
