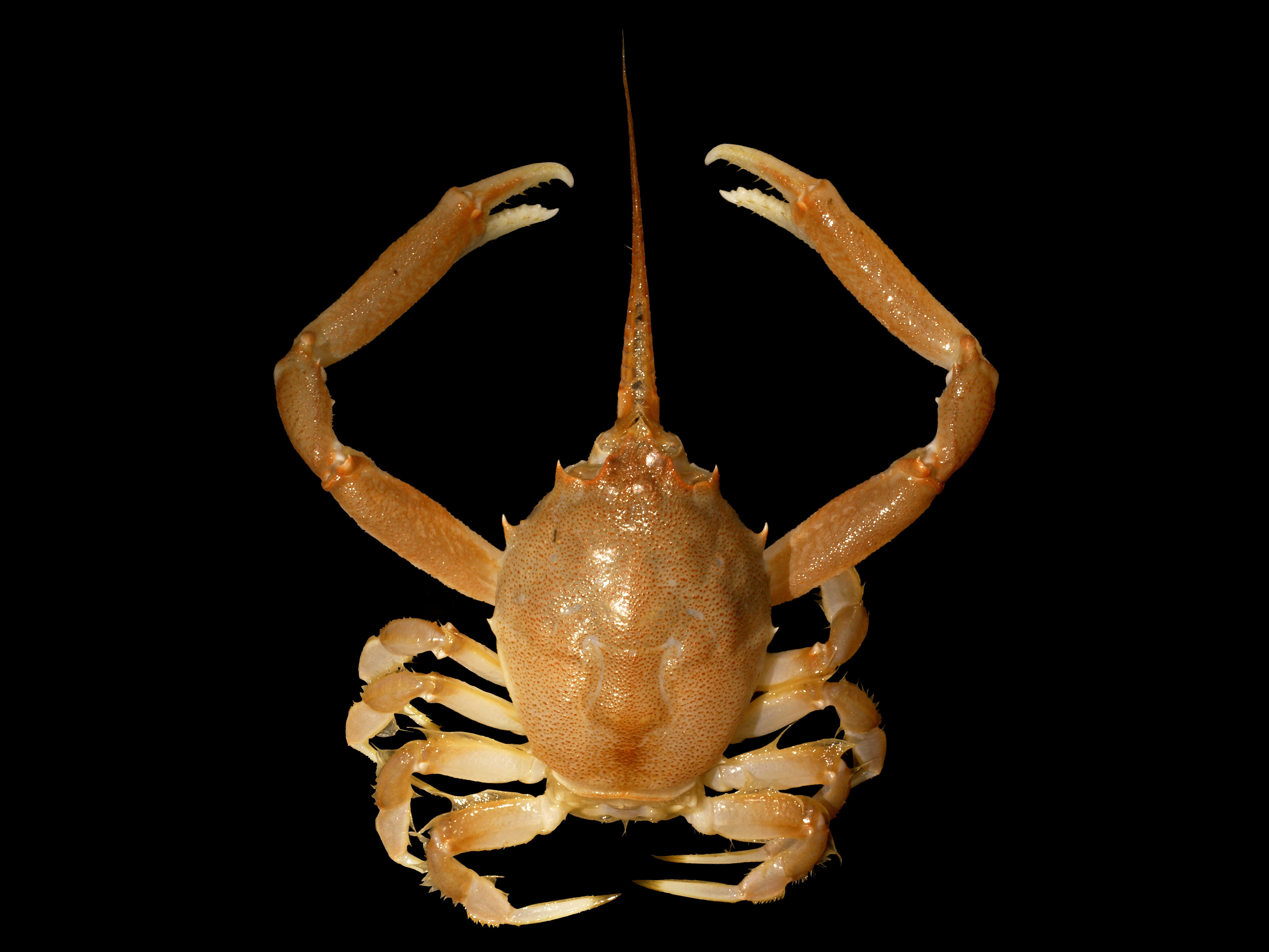
- A male C. cassivelaunus

Scientific classification
- Kingdom: Animalia
- Phylum: Arthropoda
- Class: Malacostraca
- Order: Decapoda
- Suborder: Pleocyemata
- Infraorder: Brachyura
- Family: Corystidae
- Genus: Corystes; Bosc, 1802
- Species: C. cassivelaunus

Binomial name
- Corystes cassivelaunus (Pennant, 1777)

Synonyms
- Cancer cassivelaunus Pennant, 1777; Hippa dentata Fabricius, 1793; Cancer personatus Herbst, 1785; Albunea dentata Fabricius, 1798; Corystes dentatus Latreille, 1801

= Corystes =

Corystes cassivelaunus

Genus of crabs

Corystes cassivelaunus, the masked crab, helmet crab or sand crab, is a burrowing crab of the North Atlantic and North Sea from Portugal to Norway, which also occurs in the Mediterranean Sea. It may grow up to 4 centimetres or 1.6 inches long (carapace length). The name "masked crab" derives from the patterns on the carapace which resemble a human face (a case of pareidolia), in a similar manner to heikegani. It is the only species in the genus Corystes.

C. cassivelaunus lives buried in sandy substrates, where it feeds on the infaunal invertebrates such as polychaete worms and bivalve molluscs. It uses its two antennae to form a breathing tube that allows oxygenated water down into the substrate. The chelipeds of males are much longer than the body, while those of females are only about as long as the carapace.

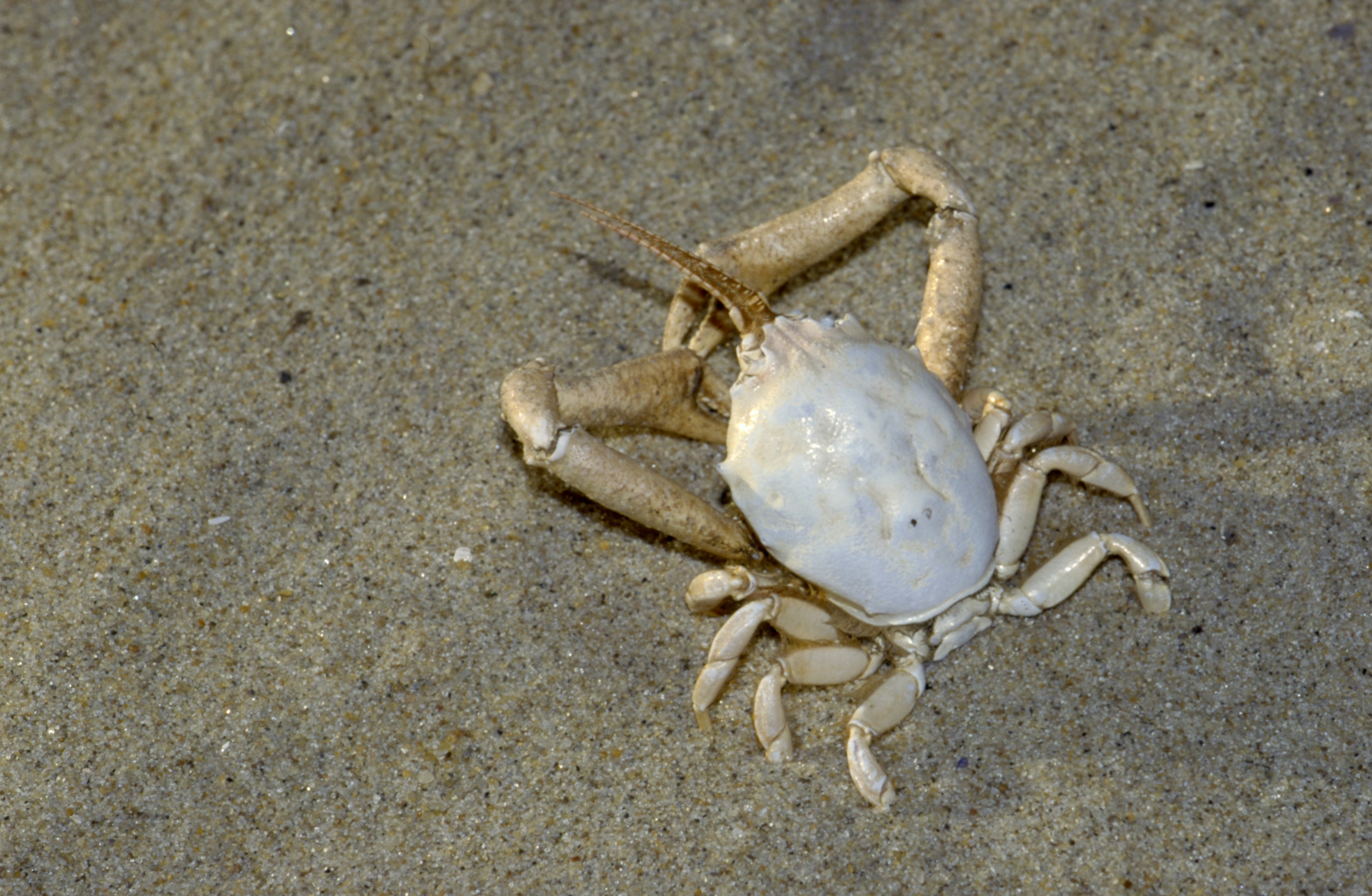
