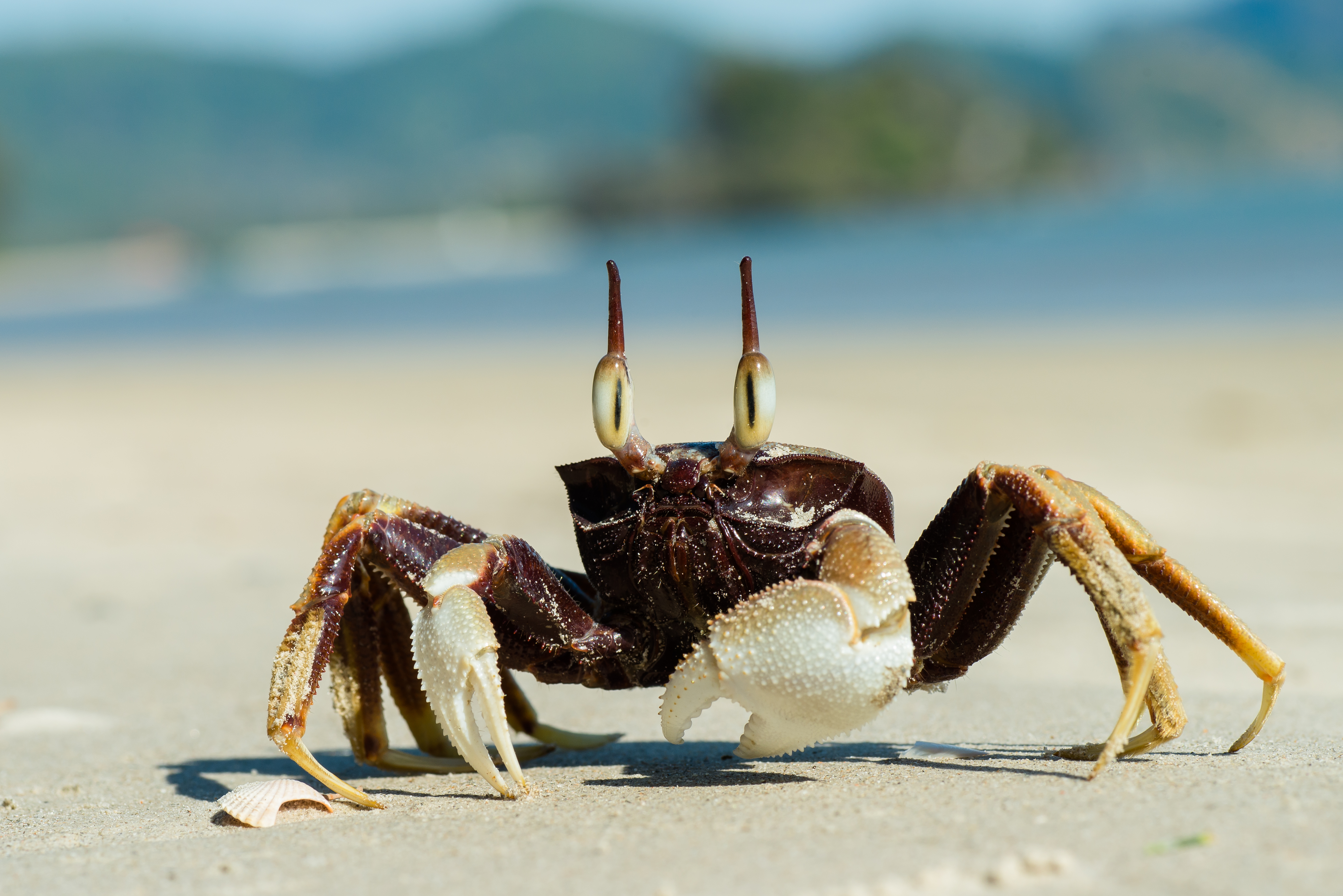
- O. ceratophthalmus, Krabi, Thailand

Scientific classification
- Kingdom: Animalia
- Phylum: Arthropoda
- Clade: Pancrustacea
- Class: Malacostraca
- Order: Decapoda
- Suborder: Pleocyemata
- Infraorder: Brachyura
- Family: Ocypodidae
- Genus: Ocypode
- Species: O. ceratophthalmus

Binomial name
- Ocypode ceratophthalmus (Pallas, 1772)

Synonyms
- Cancer ceratophthalmus Pallas, 1772; Cancer caninus Herbst, 1782; Ocypode ceratophthalmus (Pallas, 1772); Ocypode longicornuta Dana, 1852; Ocypode brevicornis var. longicornuta Dana, 1852; Ocypoda macleayana Hess, 1865; Ocypode urvillei Guérin, 1829; Ocypode rhombea Weber, 1795

= Ocypode ceratophthalmus =

Species of crab

Ocypode ceratophthalmus, the horned ghost crab or horn-eyed ghost crab, is a species of ghost crab. It is found in most of the Indo-Pacific region, with a range stretching from East Africa to the eastern parts of the Pacific.

== Taxonomy ==
Ocypode ceratophthalmus had its specific name ceratophtalmus given to it by Peter Simon Pallas when he described the species in 1772, then under the name Cancer ceratophtalmus; the species was subsequently moved from Cancer by Friedrich Weber in 1795, becoming the type species for his newly established Ocypode.

Pallas description was long thought to be the original description of the species, but a study published in 2012, undertaken to establish identities of the taxa described by the five different uses of Cancer arenarius in the historal record, discovered that the Cancer arenarius described by Olof Torén in 1765 – the oldest use of the name – was in fact Ocypode ceratophtalmus, rendering ceratophtalmus a junior synonym; however, arenarius was declared a nomen oblitum, and thus ceratophtalmus remains the accepted name.

== Description ==
As their common name implies, O. ceratophthalmus possess eyestalks extending beyond the eyes into long points, which are longer in adults, and shorter (or even absent) in juveniles. The crabs have a box-shaped body, 6–8 centimetres (2.4–3.1 in) across the carapace, with a darker markings towards the rear in the shape of an H. The outer edges of the eye-sheaths are also sharp and broadly triangular and distinctly pointing sideways in larger individuals. O. ceratophthalmus can run at speeds of up to 2.1 metres per second (6.9 ft/s).

The characteristic "horned" eyes of O. ceratophthalmus are not unique to the species, with other crabs sharing the characteristic, including O. cursor, O. gaudichaudii, O. macrocera, O. mortoni, O. rotundata, and O. saratan.

== Gallery ==
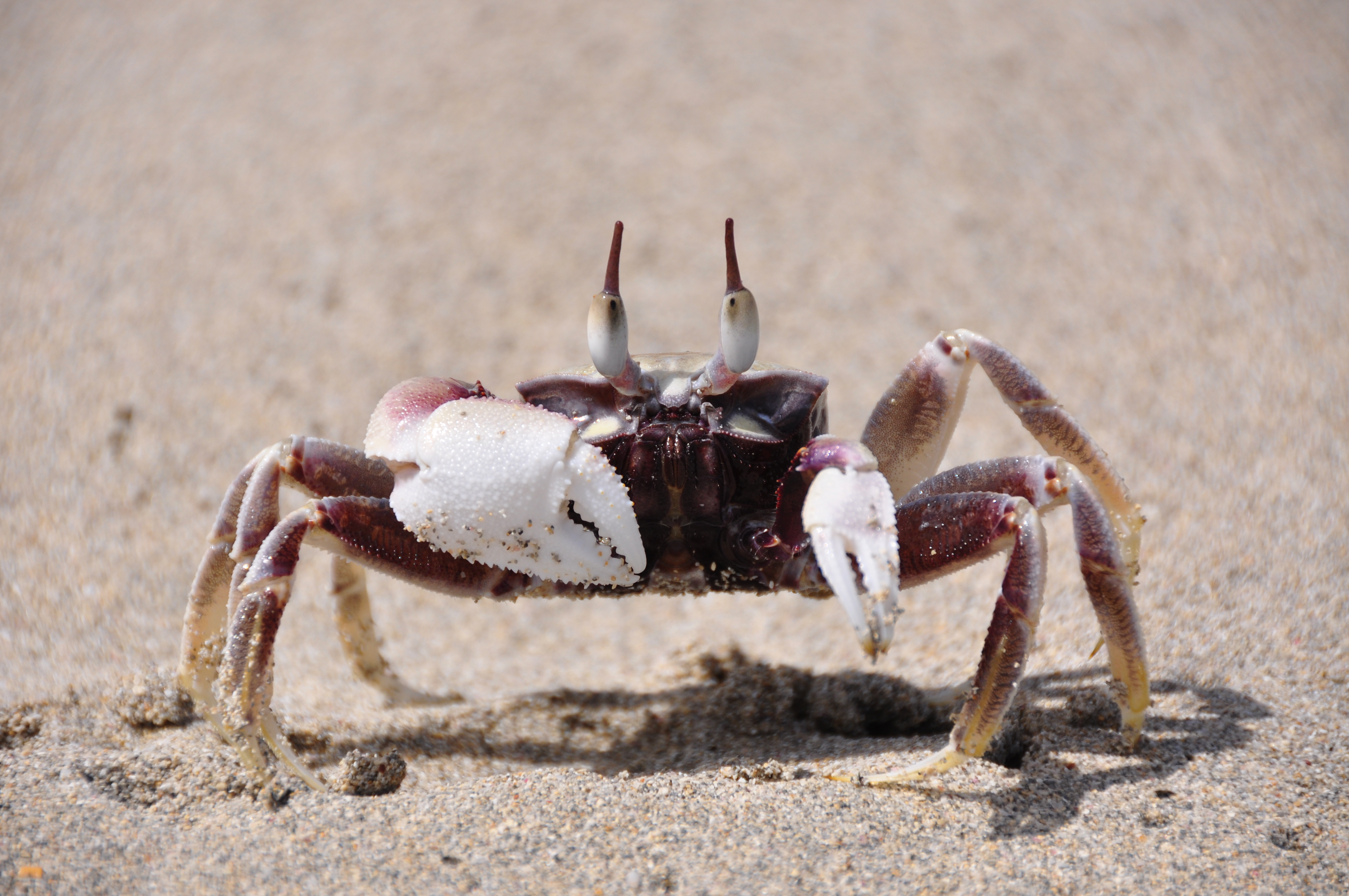
Purple O. ceratophthalmus on Kailua Beach, Hawaii

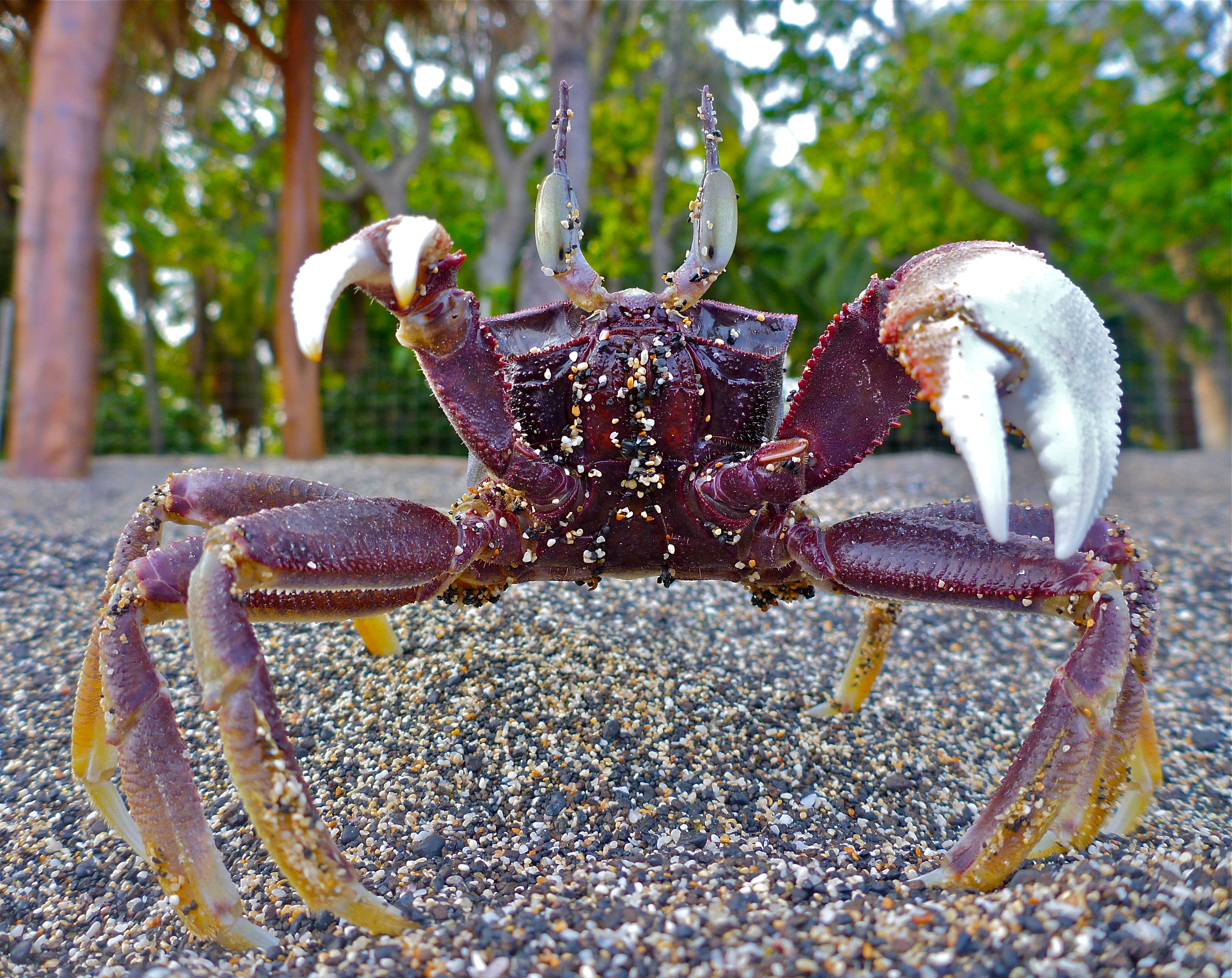
Purple O. ceratophthalmus at Kona, Hawaii

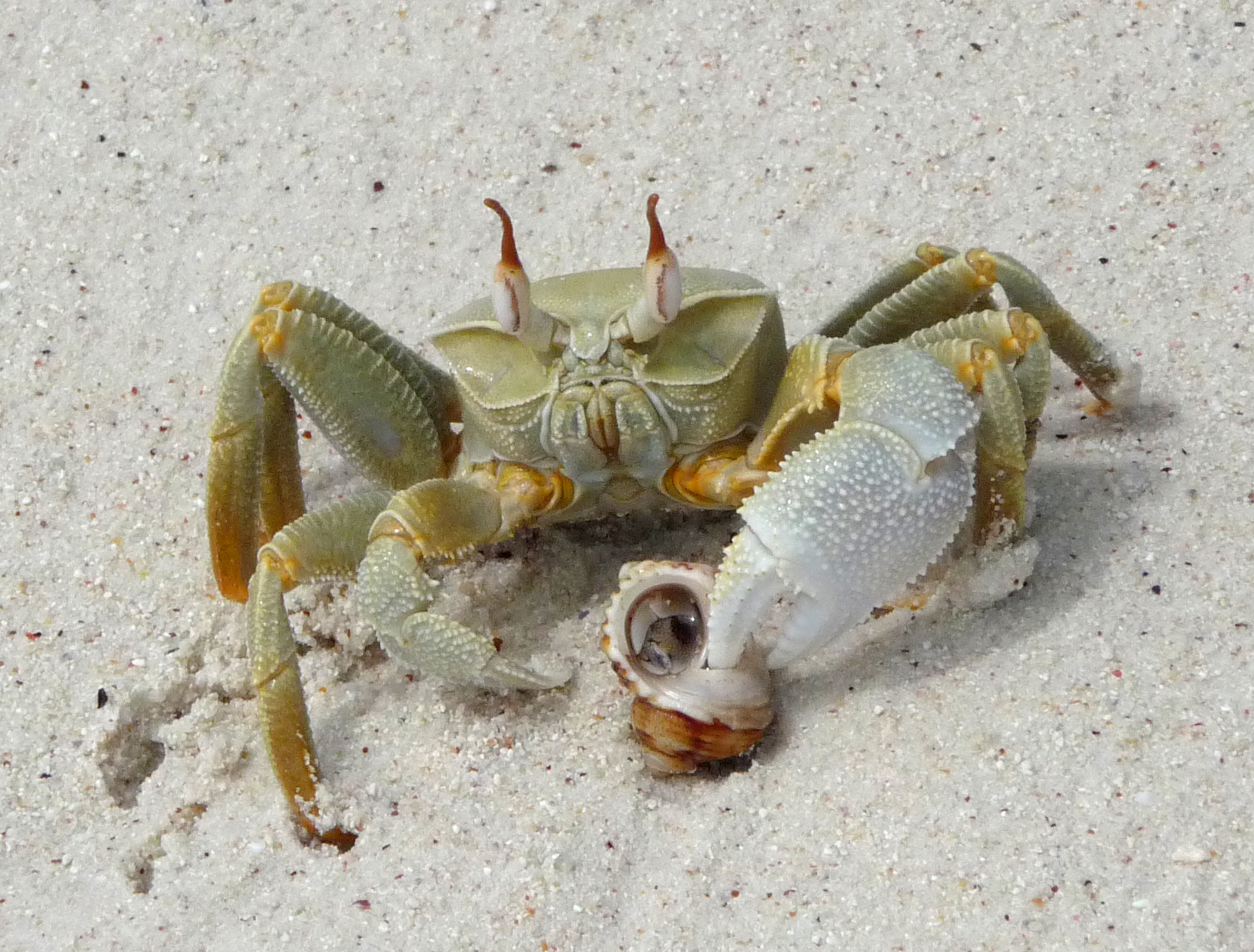
Green O. ceratophthalmus on Diego Garcia

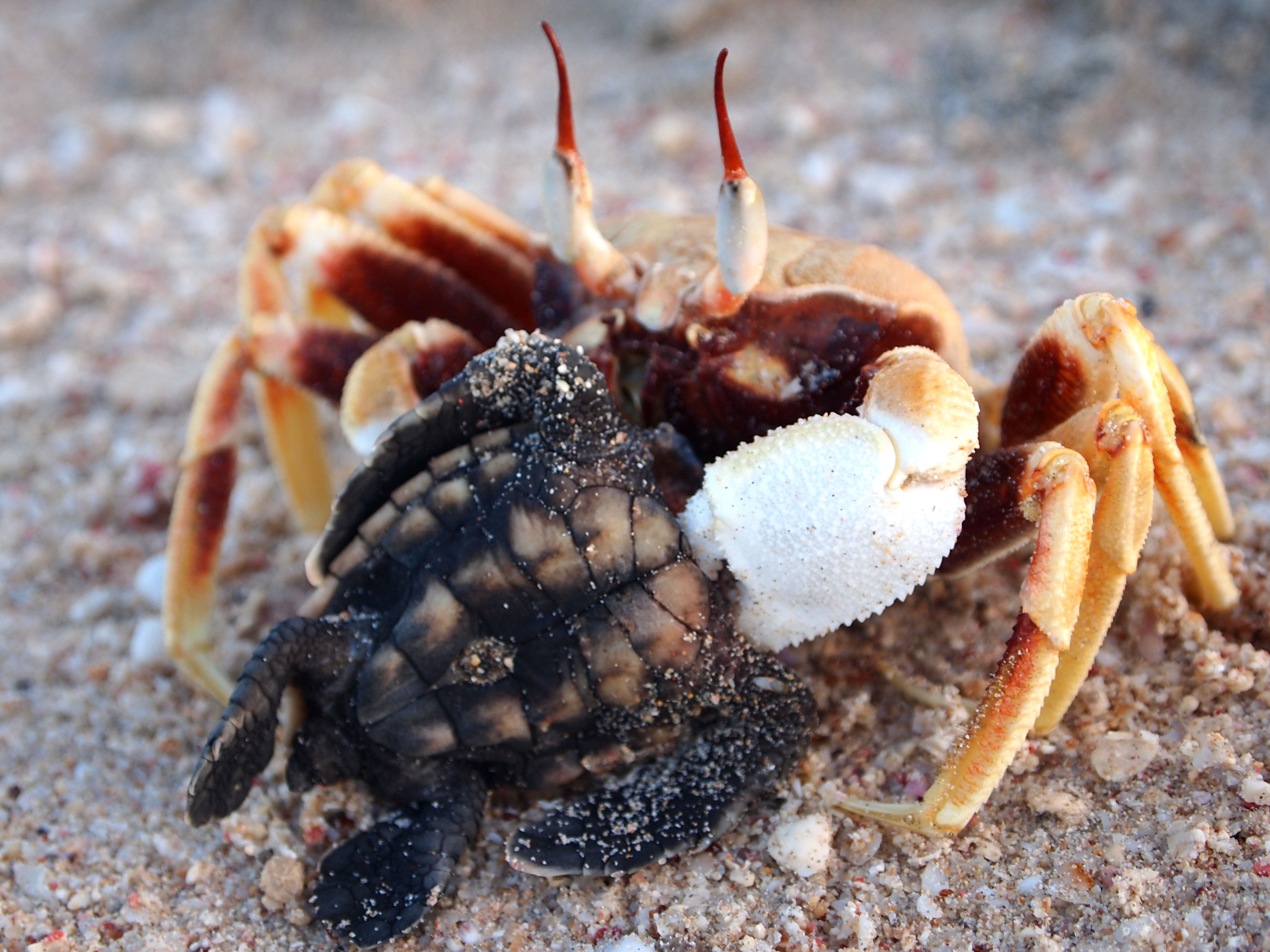
Red O. ceratophthalmus feeding on a loggerhead sea turtle (Caretta caretta) hatchling at Gnaraloo, Western Australia

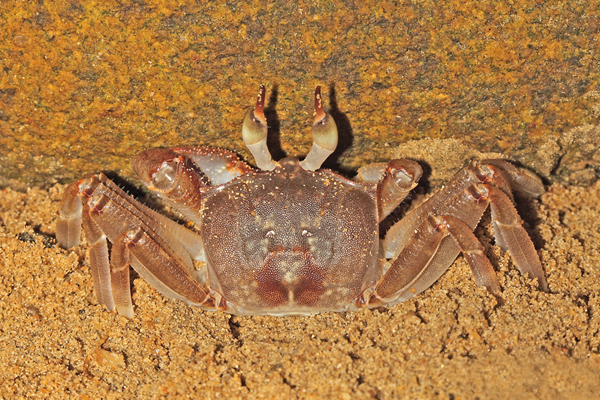
India

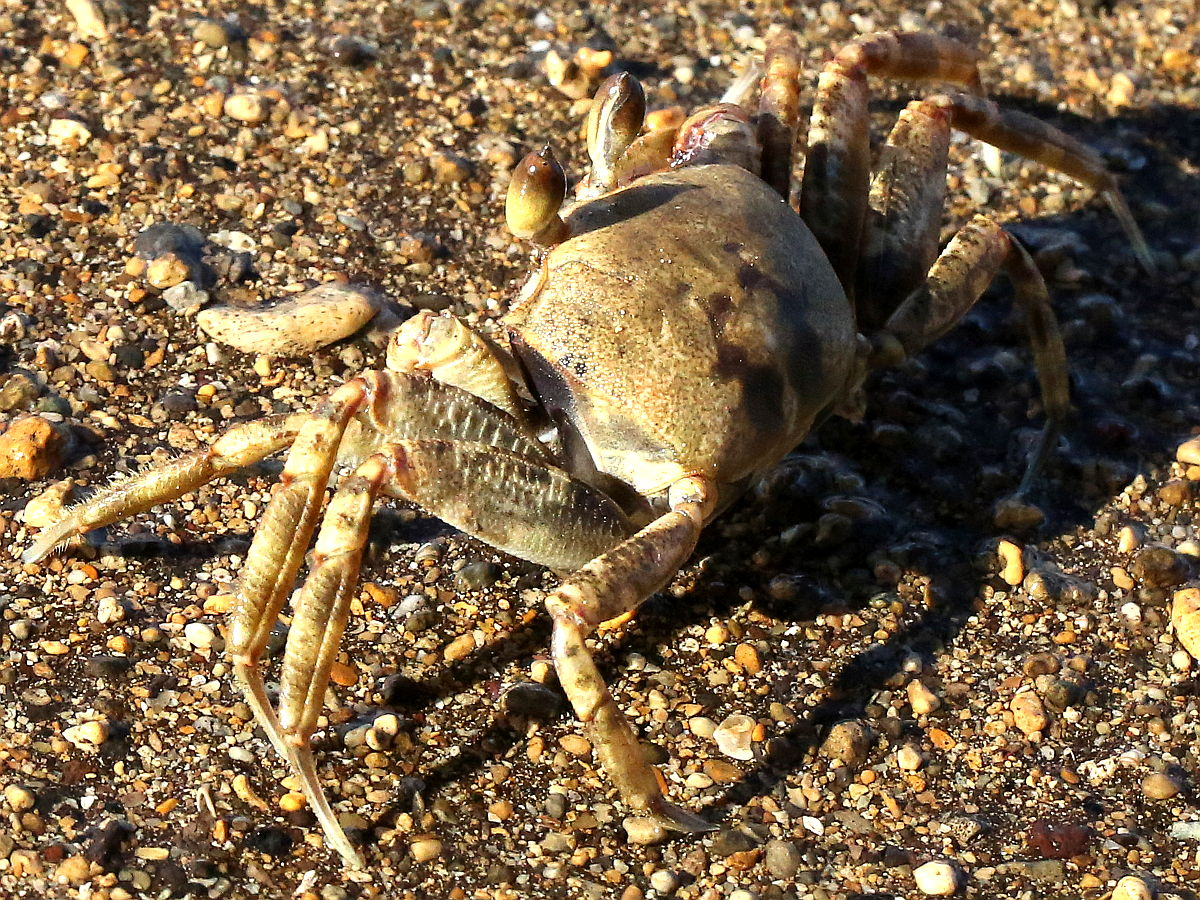
Dorsal view Molokai, Hawaii

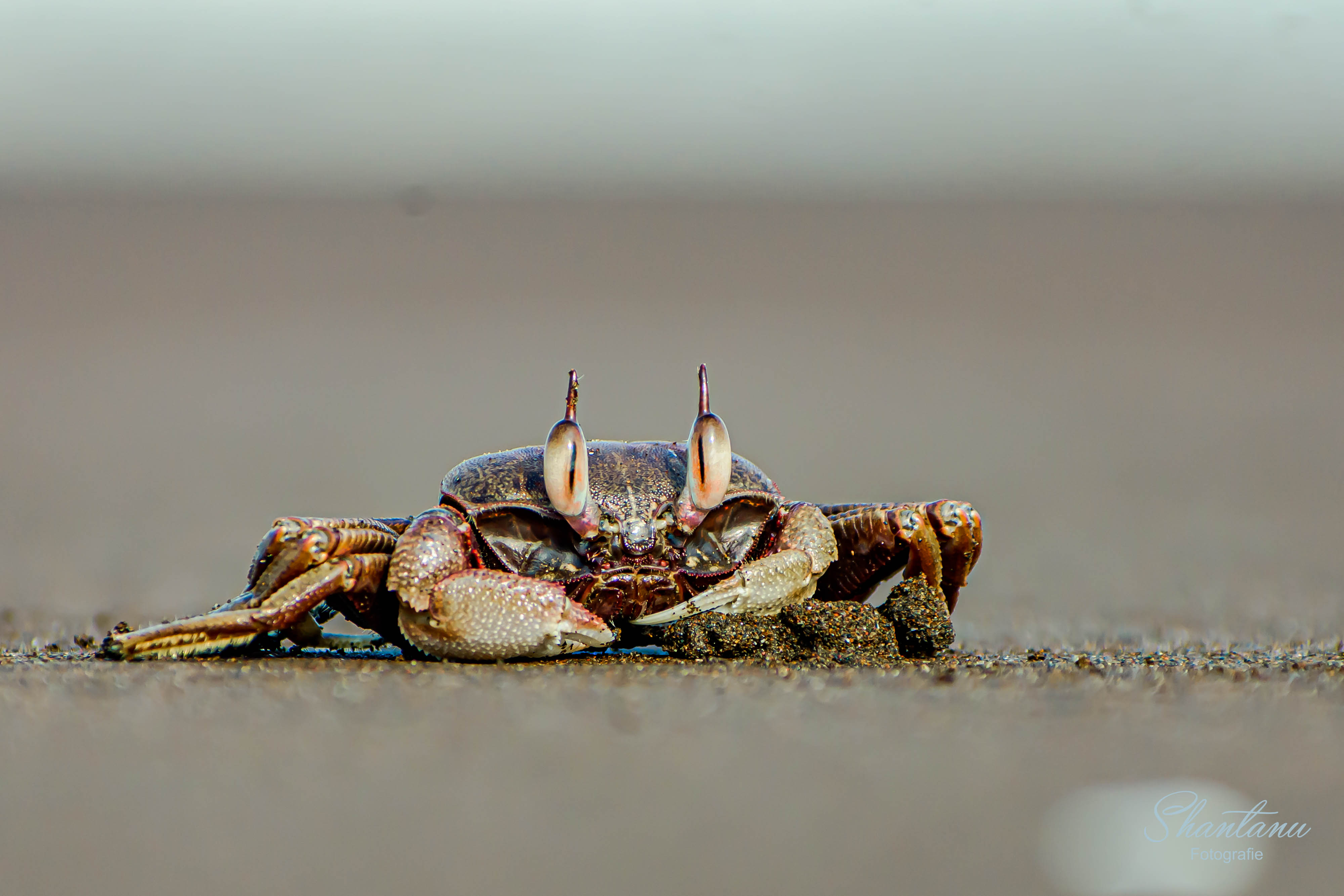
Ghost crab at velas beach
