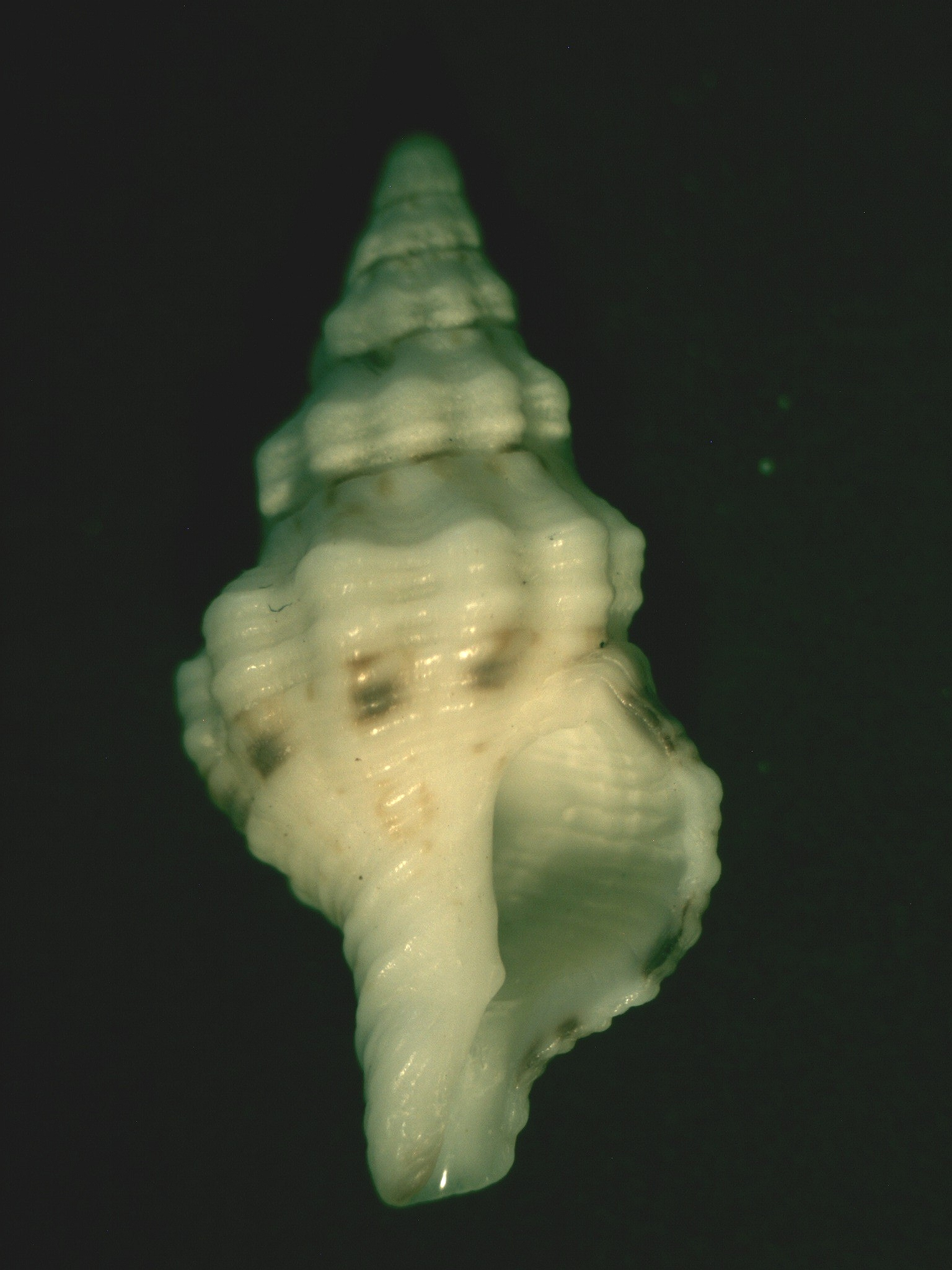
- Microcolus dunkeri

Scientific classification
- Kingdom: Animalia
- Phylum: Mollusca
- Class: Gastropoda
- Subclass: Caenogastropoda
- Order: Neogastropoda
- Family: Fasciolariidae
- Genus: Microcolus; Cotton & Godfrey, 1932

Type species
- Fusus dunkeri Jonas, 1846

= Microcolus =

Genus of gastropods

Microcolus is a genus of sea snails, marine gastropod mollusks in the family Fasciolariidae, the spindle snails, the tulip snails and their allies.

== Species ==
Species within the genus Microcolus include:

- Microcolus apiciliratus
- Microcolus dunkeri (Jonas, 1846)
- Microcolus transennus
- Microcolus vaginatus

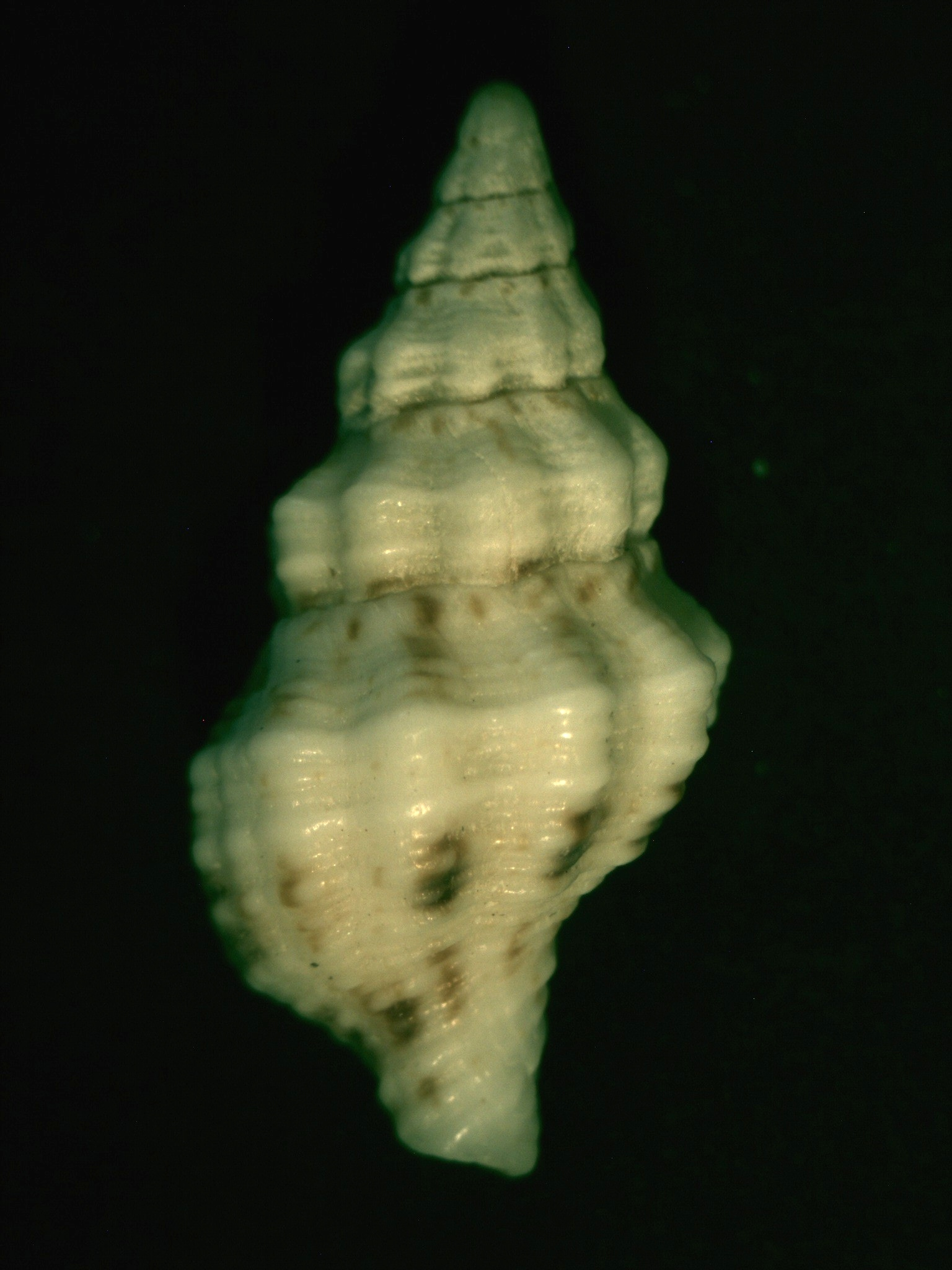
Microcolus dunkeri, abapertural view
