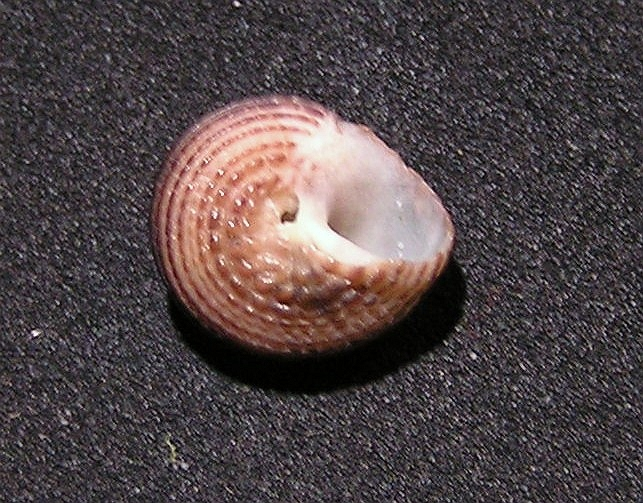
- Apertural view of Bellastraea rutidoloma

Scientific classification
- Kingdom: Animalia
- Phylum: Mollusca
- Class: Gastropoda
- Subclass: Vetigastropoda
- Order: Trochida
- Family: Turbinidae
- Genus: Bellastraea
- Species: B. rutidoloma

Binomial name
- Bellastraea rutidoloma (Tate, 1893)

Synonyms
- Astralium rutidoloma Tate, 1893; Turbo (Astralium) rutidoloma Tate, 1893 (original description)

= Bellastraea rutidoloma =

Species of gastropod

Bellastraea rutidoloma, common name the granular small star, is a species of sea snail, a marine gastropod mollusk in the family Turbinidae, the turban snails.

== Description ==
(Original description by R. Tate) The shell has a lenticular-conoid shape, about equally sloping above and below from the angular periphery. The 4½ whorls are flat. The embryonic contains 1½ whorls fimbriated at the suture. The umbilicus is minute. The upper surface of the body whorl shows a stout and a broad lira next to the suture, which is transversely crenulate-ridged. The periphery is bluntly angled by a slightly compressed convex keel, which is obsoletely crenulated. Between the keel and the sutural band are three granulose lirae about equidistant and equal-sized but the anterior one is close to the keel (in older specimens a small lira is interposed next the suture, and there is a tendency in the granules of the lirae to become somewhat confluent). The intervals between the lirae are smooth. The base has four granulose lirae. The umbilical region is bounded by a broad ridge, which is broken up into claviform tubercles obliquely disposed. The colour is greenish-brown in living specimens, flesh-coloured with rufous lirae and darker tinted at the suture and keel in beach examples. The interior of the aperture of living examples is greenish and of a pearly lustre.

== Distribution ==
This marine species is endemic to Australia and occurs off South Australia.
