= Turbo magnificus =

Scientific classification
- Kingdom: Animalia
- Phylum: Mollusca
- Class: Gastropoda
- Subclass: Vetigastropoda
- Order: Trochida
- Family: Turbinidae
- Genus: Turbo
- Species: T. magnificus

Binomial name
- Turbo magnificus Jonas, 1844

Synonyms
- Turbo (Taeniaturbo) magnificus Jonas, 1844

Species of gastropod

Turbo magnificus, common name the magnificent turban, is a species of sea snail, a marine gastropod mollusk in the family Turbinidae, the turban snails. This Indo-Pacific species exhibits significant sexual dimorphism, with mature females developing shells averaging 60-70 mm in diameter (often exceeding 100 g in weight), while males typically reach only 30-45 mm.

== Notes ==
Additional information regarding this species:

- Taxonomic status: Some authors place the name in the subgenus Turbo (Taeniaturbo)

== Description ==
The length of the shell varies between 30 mm and 70 mm.

== Distribution ==
This species occurs in the Pacific Ocean from Ecuador to Chile.
