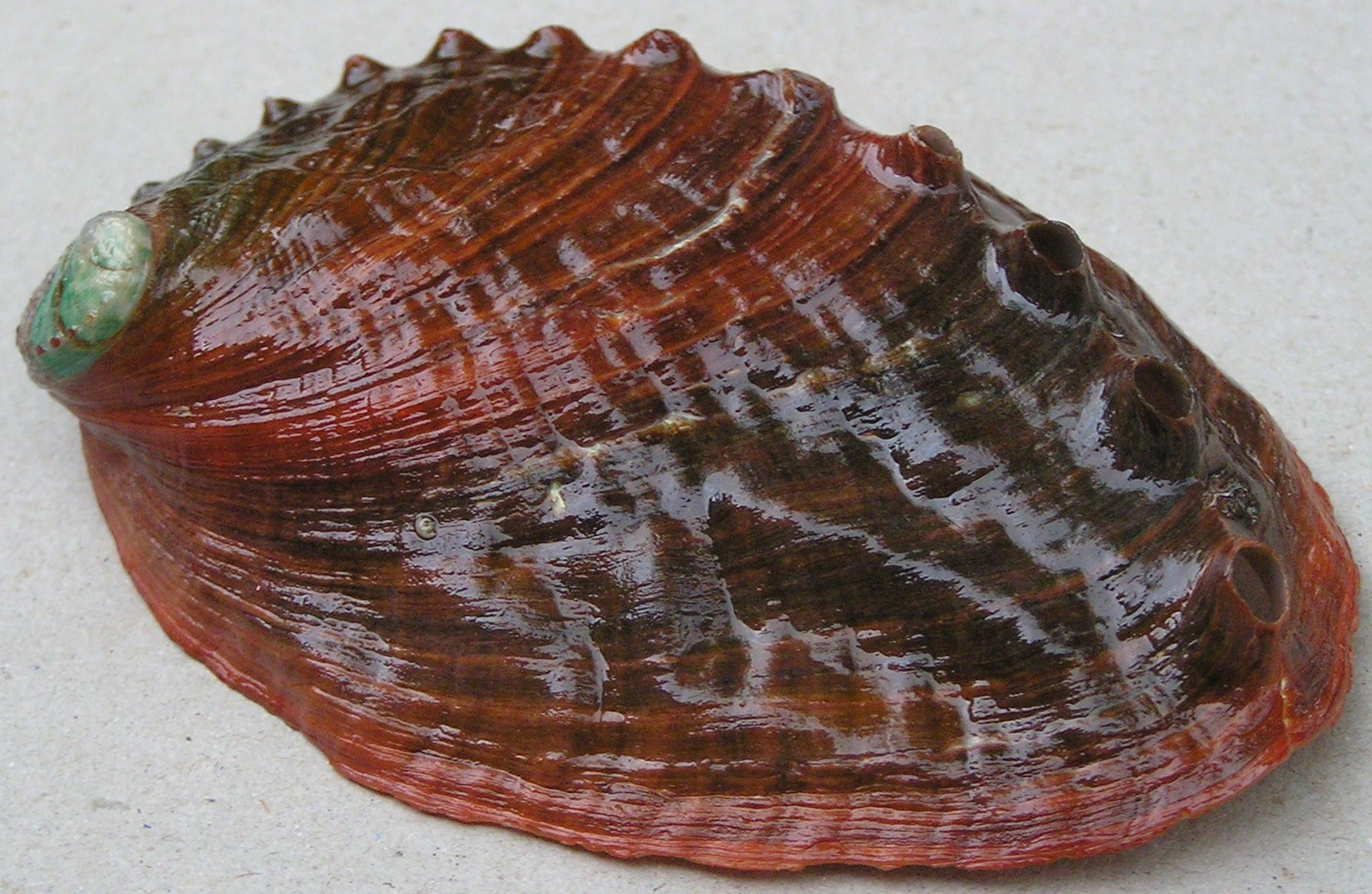
- A shell of Haliotis kamtschatkana kamtschatkana
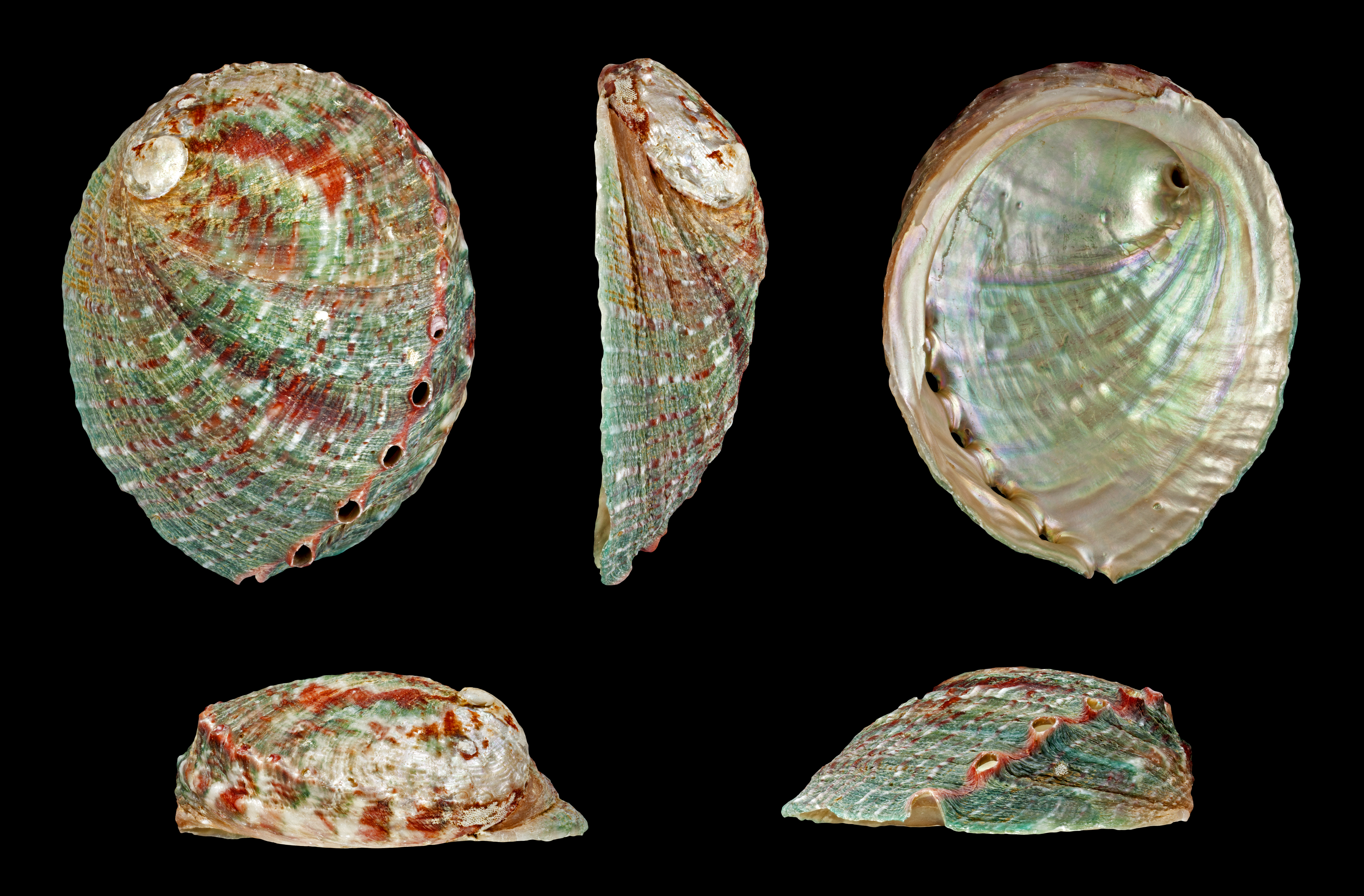
- A shell of Haliotis kamtschatkana assimilis

Conservation status
- Endangered (IUCN 3.1)

- Apparently Secure (NatureServe)

Scientific classification
- Kingdom: Animalia
- Phylum: Mollusca
- Class: Gastropoda
- Subclass: Vetigastropoda
- Order: Lepetellida
- Family: Haliotidae
- Genus: Haliotis
- Species: H. kamtschatkana

Binomial name
- Haliotis kamtschatkana (Jonas, 1845)

Synonyms
- Haliotis gigantea var. kamtschatkana Jonas, 1845

= Haliotis kamtschatkana =

Species of gastropod

Haliotis kamtschatkana, common name the northern abalone, threaded abalone, or pinto abalone, is a species of large sea snail, a marine gastropod mollusc in the family Haliotidae, the abalone.

It has been listed as endangered by the IUCN Red List of Endangered Species since 2006.

== Taxonomy ==
Sometimes two subspecies Haliotis kamtschatkana are recognized, though the World Register of Marine Species treats this species as monotypic:

- Haliotis kamtschatkana assimilis Dall, 1878
- Haliotis kamtschatkana kamtschatkana Jonas, 1845

== Description ==
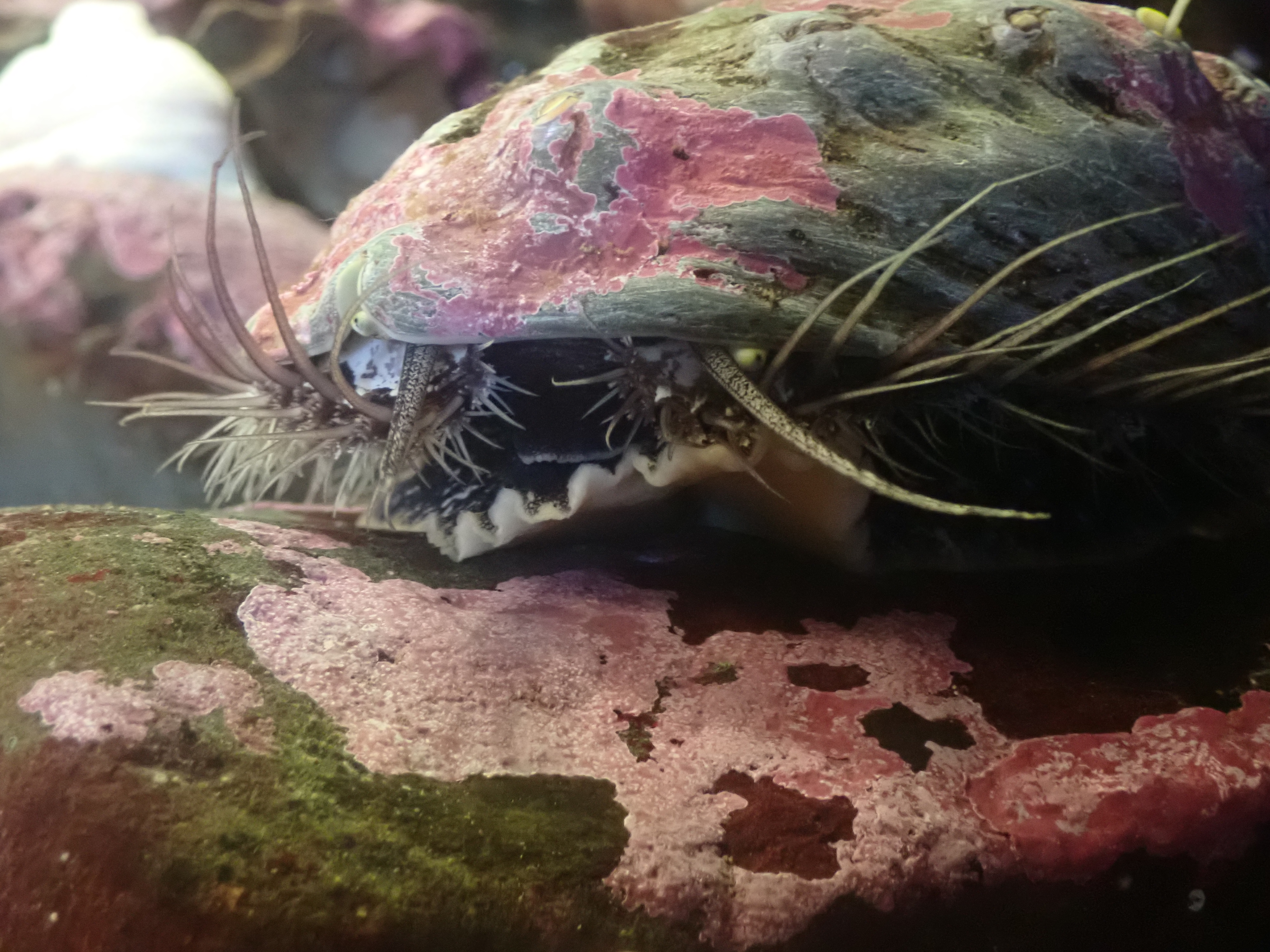
Sensory tentacles protrude from around the foot

The pinto abalone has an adult shell size of approximately 8 cm (3.1 in) but it can rarely grow as large as 15 cm (5.9 in). The rather thin shell is flattened and ear-shaped. The surface is covered with uneven spiral cords, often very indistinct, and strongly elevated undulations or lumps. The columellar shelf is narrow, flattened, and sloping inward. The shell has 3 to 6 elevated respiratory holes. These holes collectively make up what is known as the selenizone which form as the shell grows. The silvery interior of the shell is iridescent. The shell is generally green-brown but can have white or blue coloration and has a somewhat scalloped edge. The epipodium is lacy and green-brown in color. Tentacles surrounding the foot and extending out of the shell sense food and predators.

== Distribution ==
Pinto abalone are found in kelp beds and in rocky areas in the northeast Pacific Ocean, where they range from Salisbury Sound, Alaska, along the coasts of Canada and contiguous United States to Baja California, Mexico. This is the Pacific abalone species with the widest latitudinal distribution in North America.

=== Status by location ===
In California, Pinto abalone were never a major component of recreational or commercial catch. There was however a 10-fold decline in abundance in northern California. (156,000 in 1971 to 18,000 in 1999–2001)

In Alaska, peak harvest was between 1978 and 1981 (260,000 lbs); average harvest declined to 50,000 lbs in 1994. The commercial fishery was closed in 1996; recreational free-diving fishery remains.

In Washington State, there was no historical commercial fishing; the recreational fishing closed in 1994 due to declines in abundance. Surveys in the San Juan Islands indicate a decline in density at many sites. Densities at all but one site are below or within the minimum range for successful fertilization. Abalone size has increased between 1996 and 2006 but abundance has not.

In Canada, the fishery began in the early 1970s and the peak fishery was in 1977–1978 (400t). Subsequently, there was a population decline and quotas were instituted. As populations did not recover there were continuing quota reductions through 1989 (47.2t) without population response. The fishery was closed in 1990 to all user groups but since the closure, the population decline has continued.

== Habitat ==
This species lives on rocky shores. These abalone are found intertidally or subtidally near kelp to 30 feet (9 m) depth, but they can be found to 330 feet (100 m) depth. Like all abalone, they are herbivorous.

== Reproduction ==
They broadcast spawn from April to June. Larval dispersal is limited. Lifespan is about 15 years.

== Human use ==
Both the consumption and the shells of the pinto abalone have played a role in Tlingit and Haida cultures.

== Conservation ==
Population size has declined due to overharvesting, illegal harvesting, predation by recovering sea otters, and disease. Because of concerns about its status the Northern Abalone is a U.S. National Marine Fisheries Service Species of Concern. Species of Concern are those species about which the U.S. Government's National Oceanic and Atmospheric Administration, National Marine Fisheries Service (NMFS), has some concerns regarding status and threats, but for which insufficient information has been available to indicate a need to list the species under the U.S. Endangered Species Act. The species is called pinto abalone by NMFS. The National Marine Fisheries Service announced in November 2013 that it will conduct a status review for the pinto abalone. The Natural Resources Defense Council and the Center for Biological Diversity filed petitions over the summer calling for a status review that could lead to added protections for the species. The Center for Biological Diversity filed its petition August 1, 2013. On December 29, 2014, NMFS announced its finding that the pinto abalone was not warranted for listing.

This species is now endangered according to the International Union for Conservation of Nature, mainly due to uncontrolled harvesting and poaching of the species for food. The state of Washington never permitted commercial harvest and recreation take was outlawed in 1994. Alaska outlawed commercial harvest in 1996.

Harvest has been illegal in Canada since 1990. The Committee on the Status of Endangered Wildlife in Canada (COSEWIC) has listed it as an endangered species. The Canadian Species at Risk Act listed it in the List of Wildlife Species at Risk as being endangered in Canada.

== Resources ==
- Rosenberg, G. (1992). Encyclopedia of Seashells. Dorset: New York. 224 pp.
- Turgeon, D.D., et al. (1998). Common and scientific names of aquatic invertebrates of the United States and Canada. American Fisheries Society Special Publication, 26 pp: 57.
- Geiger, D.L. & Poppe, G.T. (2000). A Conchological Iconography: The family Haliotidae. Conchbooks, Hackenheim Germany. 135 pp 83 pls.
- Geiger, D.L. & Owen, B. (2012). Abalone: Worldwide Haliotidae. Hackenheim: Conchbooks. viii + 361 pp.
