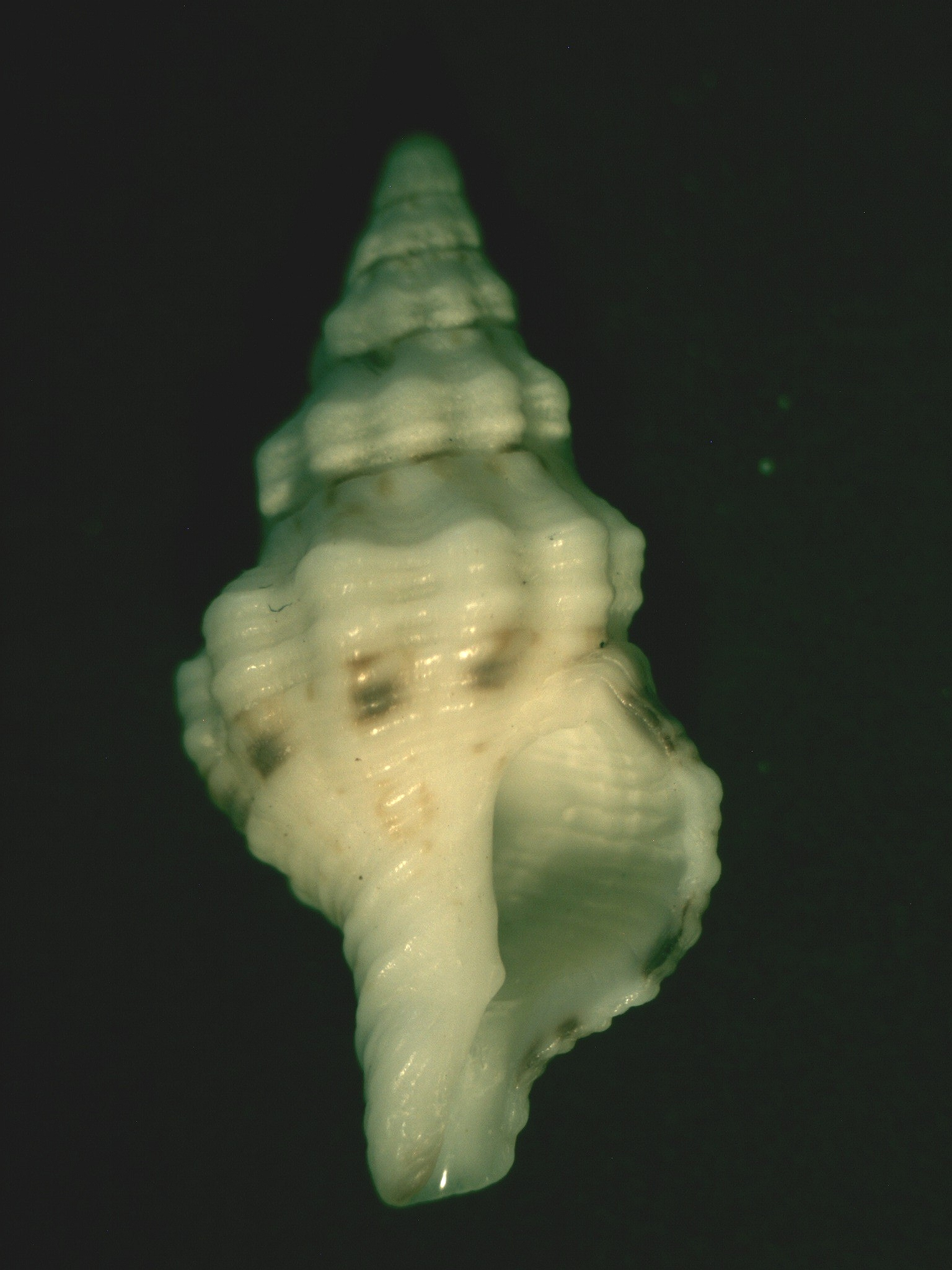

Scientific classification
- Kingdom: Animalia
- Phylum: Mollusca
- Class: Gastropoda
- Subclass: Caenogastropoda
- Order: Neogastropoda
- Family: Fasciolariidae
- Genus: Microcolus
- Species: M. dunkeri

Binomial name
- Microcolus dunkeri (Jonas, 1846)

Synonyms
- Fusus dunkeri Jonas, 1846

= Microcolus dunkeri =

Species of gastropod

Microcolus dunkeri is a species of sea snail, a marine gastropod mollusk in the family Fasciolariidae, the spindle snails, the tulip snails and their allies.
