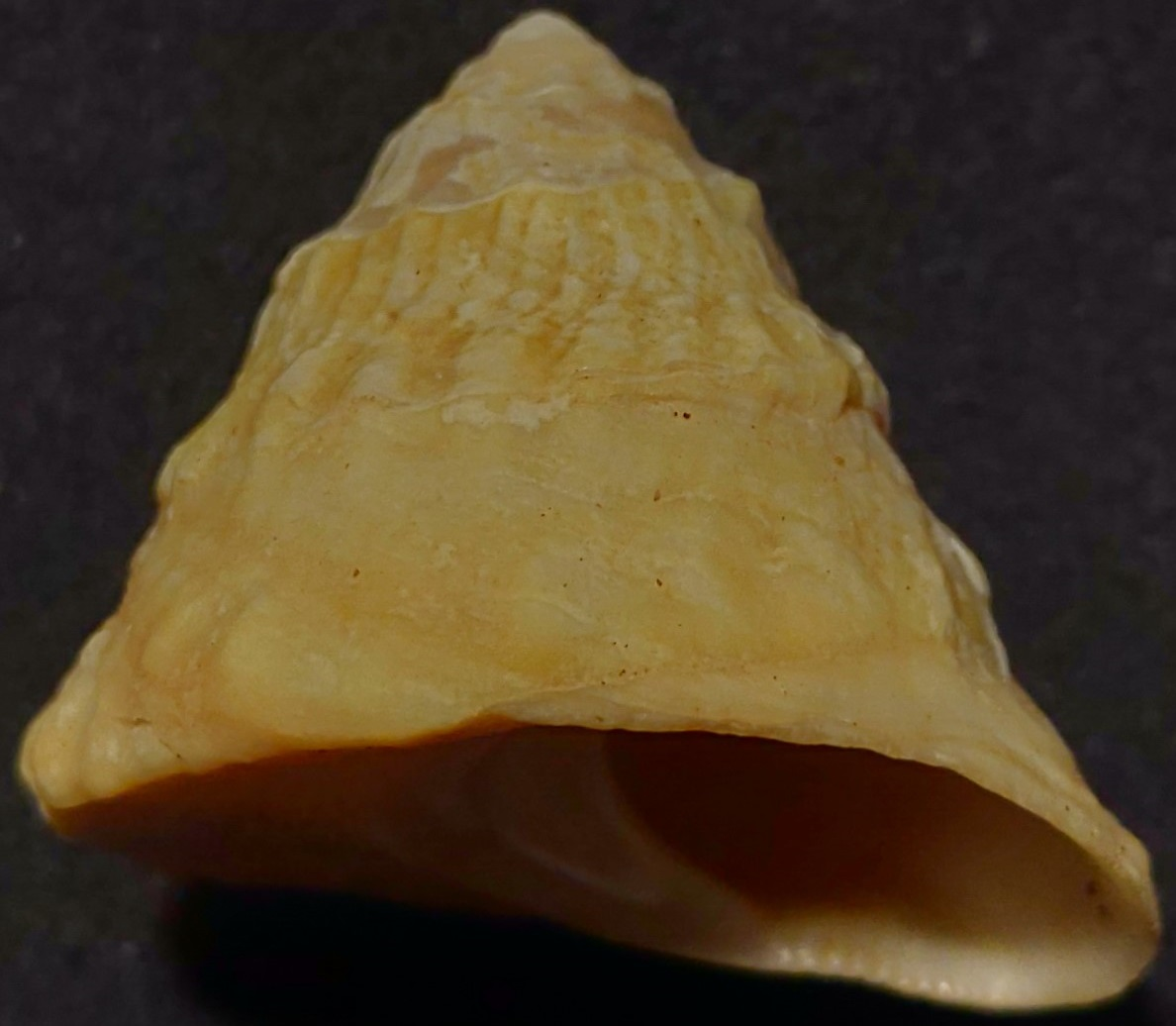
- Shell of Astralium tentoriiforme

Scientific classification
- Kingdom: Animalia
- Phylum: Mollusca
- Class: Gastropoda
- Subclass: Vetigastropoda
- Order: Trochida
- Family: Turbinidae
- Genus: Astralium
- Species: A. tentoriiforme

Binomial name
- Astralium tentoriiforme (Jonas, 1845)

Synonyms
- Astraea sirius Hedley, C., 1923; Astralium tentoriiformis (Jonas, 1845); Bellastraea urvillei Philippi, R.A., 1852; Trochus tentoriiformis Jonas, 1845 (basionym); Turbo sirius Gould, 1849

= Astralium tentoriiforme =

Species of gastropod

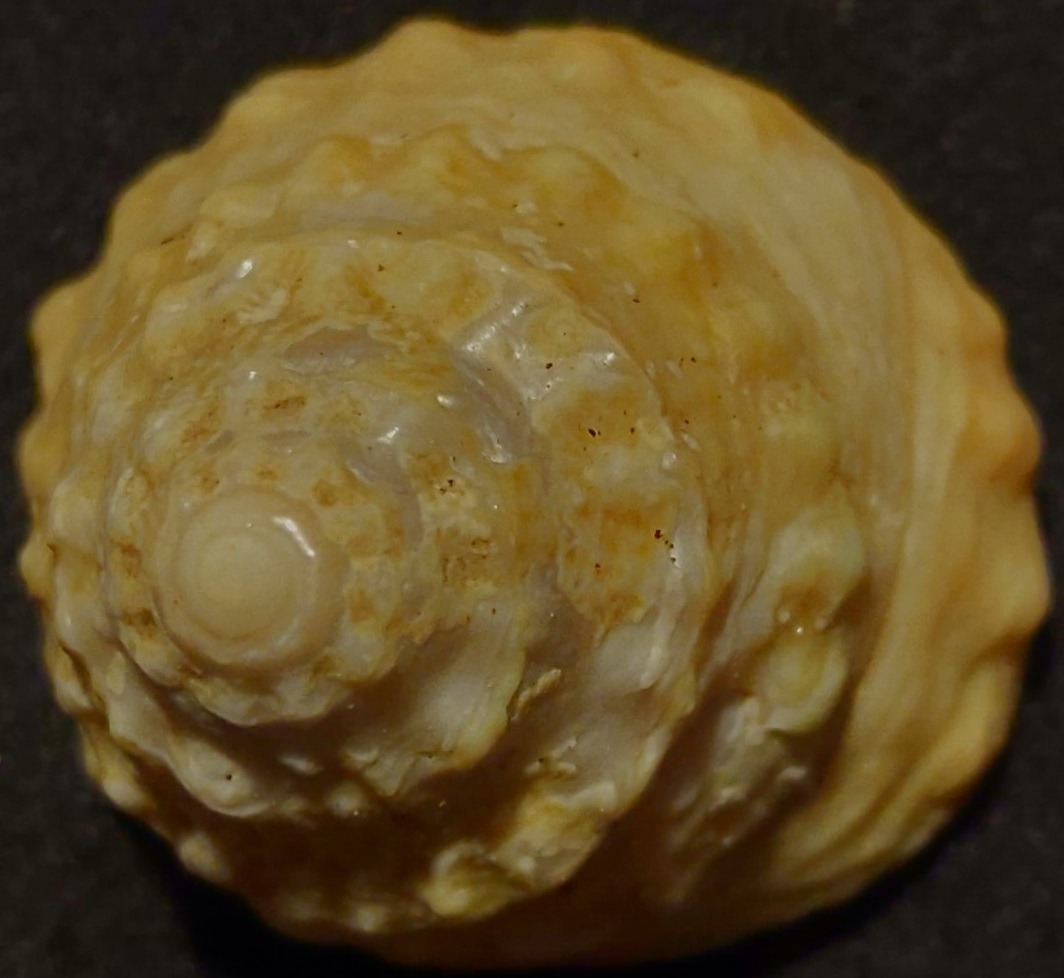

Astralium tentoriiforme, common name the common tent shell, is a species of sea snail, a marine gastropod mollusk in the family Turbinidae, the turban snails.

== Description ==
The length of the shell varies between 25 mm and 45 mm. The imperforate, solid shell has an elate-conic shape. Its color pattern is pale yellowish. The spire is elevated and contains 7–8 whorls. These are very obliquely finely wrinkled and flat above. The base of the shell is concave. The periphery is acutely carinated, above the carina are obscurely longitudinally folded. The base contains numerous regular concentric squamose lirae. The aperture is very oblique. It is silvery within and angled at the carina. The basal margin is nearly straight, tinged with pink. The short columella is wide and arcuate, sometimes pinkish, terminating in a tubercle below. The parietal callus usually covers more than half the surface of the base. Its margin is often elevated.

The operculum is oval, brown within with sublateral nucleus; outside white, with a curved sub-obsolete central rib and an obsolete short basal rib.

== Distribution ==
This marine species is endemic to Australia and occurs off Queensland to New South Wales.
