= Jonas (crab) =

Scientific classification
- Domain: Eukaryota
- Kingdom: Animalia
- Phylum: Arthropoda
- Class: Malacostraca
- Order: Decapoda
- Suborder: Pleocyemata
- Infraorder: Brachyura
- Family: Corystidae
- Genus: Jonas; Hombron & Jacquinot, 1846

Genus of crabs

Jonas is a genus of crustaceans belonging to the family Corystidae.

The species of this genus are found in Japan, Malesia and Australia.

Species:

- Jonas choprai Serène, 1971
- Jonas distinctus (De Haan, 1835)
- Jonas formosae (Balss, 1922)
- Jonas indicus (Chopra, 1935)
- Jonas kalpakkamensis Barathkumar, N.P.I.Das & Satpathy, 2016
- Jonas leuteanus Ward, 1933
- Jonas macrophthalmus Hombron & Jacquinot, 1846
