= Sand crab =

The common term sand crab can refer to various species of crustacean:

- Crustaceans of the superfamily Hippoidea, often known as mole crabs
- Hippidae, a family within Hippoidea
- Emerita (crustacean), a genus within Hippidae
- Crabs of the subfamily Ocypodidae, also commonly known as ghost crabs
- Corystes cassivelaunus, found around the North Atlantic, Mediterranean Sea and North Sea
- Ovalipes australiensis, found on Australia's south coast
- Portunus pelagicus, an Indo-Pacific swimming crab
