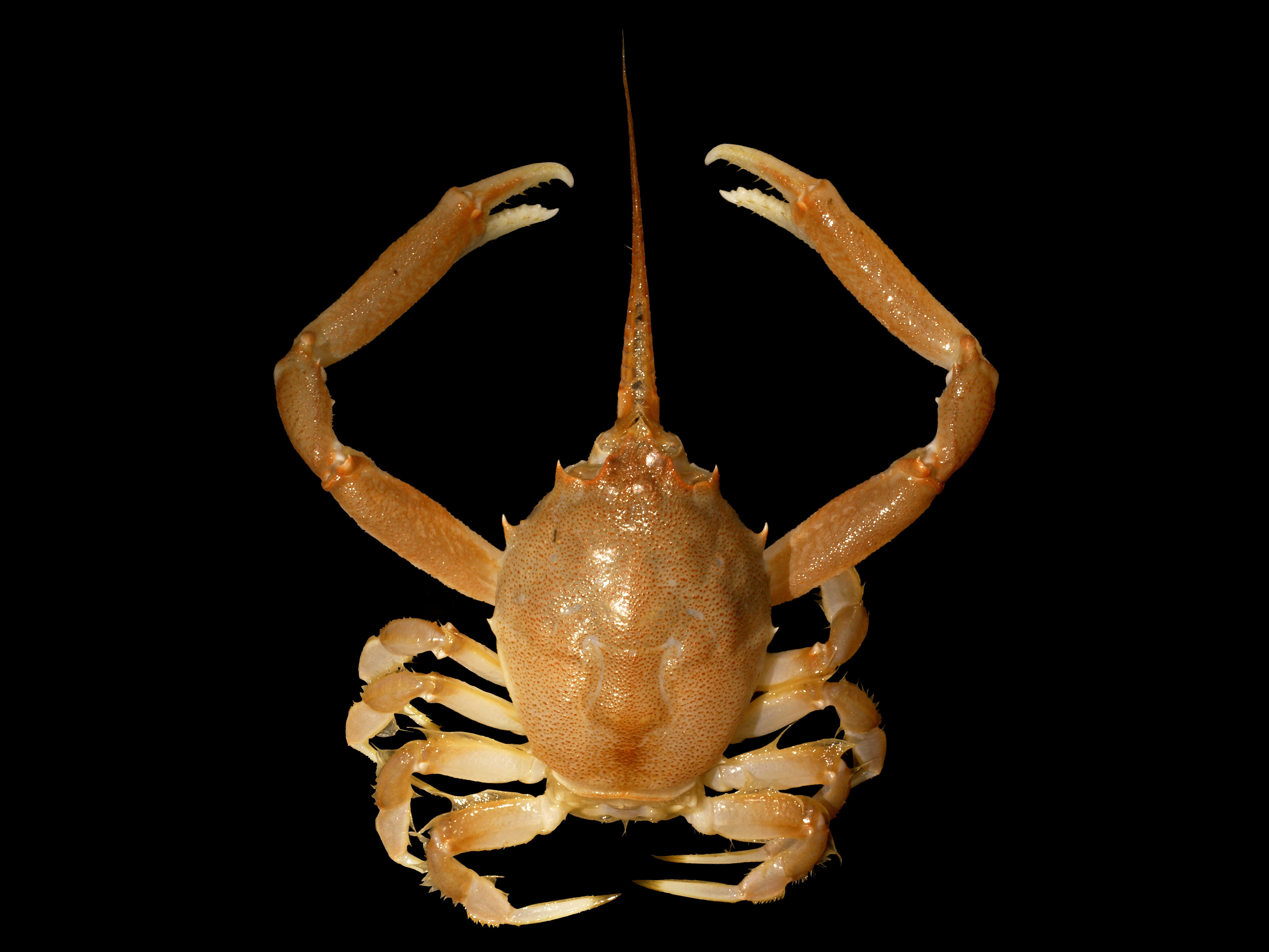
- Corystes cassivelaunus

Scientific classification
- Kingdom: Animalia
- Phylum: Arthropoda
- Clade: Pancrustacea
- Class: Malacostraca
- Order: Decapoda
- Suborder: Pleocyemata
- Infraorder: Brachyura
- Section: Eubrachyura
- Subsection: Heterotremata
- Superfamily: Corystoidea; Samouelle, 1819
- Family: Corystidae; Samouelle, 1819

Genera
- See text

= Corystidae =

Corystidae Temporal range: Miocene–Recent

Family of crabs

Corystidae is a family of crabs, in its own superfamily, Corystoidea. It includes what was once thought to be the oldest Eubrachyuran fossil, Hebertides jurassica, thought to be dating from the Bathonian (Middle Jurassic); the species was subsequently reinterpreted as being Cenozoic in age. Corystidae contains ten extant and five extinct species in eight genera:

- Corystes Bosc, 1802
- Corystites Lőrenthey, in Lőrenthey & Beurlen, 1929
- Gomeza Gray, 1831
- Gomezinus † Collins, Lee & Noad, 2003
- Harenacorystes † Van Bakel, Jagt, Artal & Fraaije, 2009
- Hebertides † Guinot, De Angeli & Garassino, 2007
- Jonas Hombron & Jacquinot, 1846
- Micromithrax † Noetling, 1881
