= Territory (animal) =

Area a wild animal consistently defends

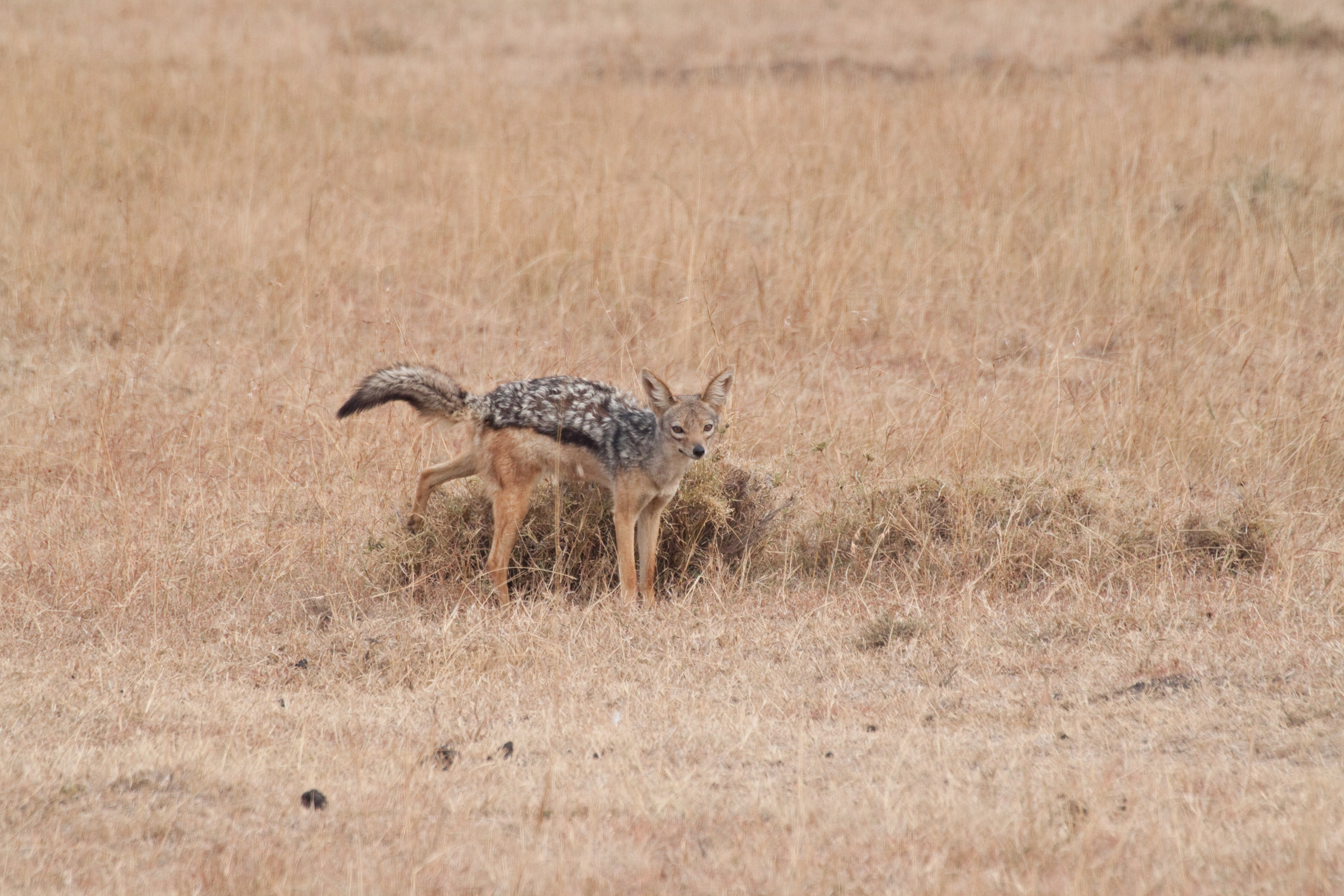
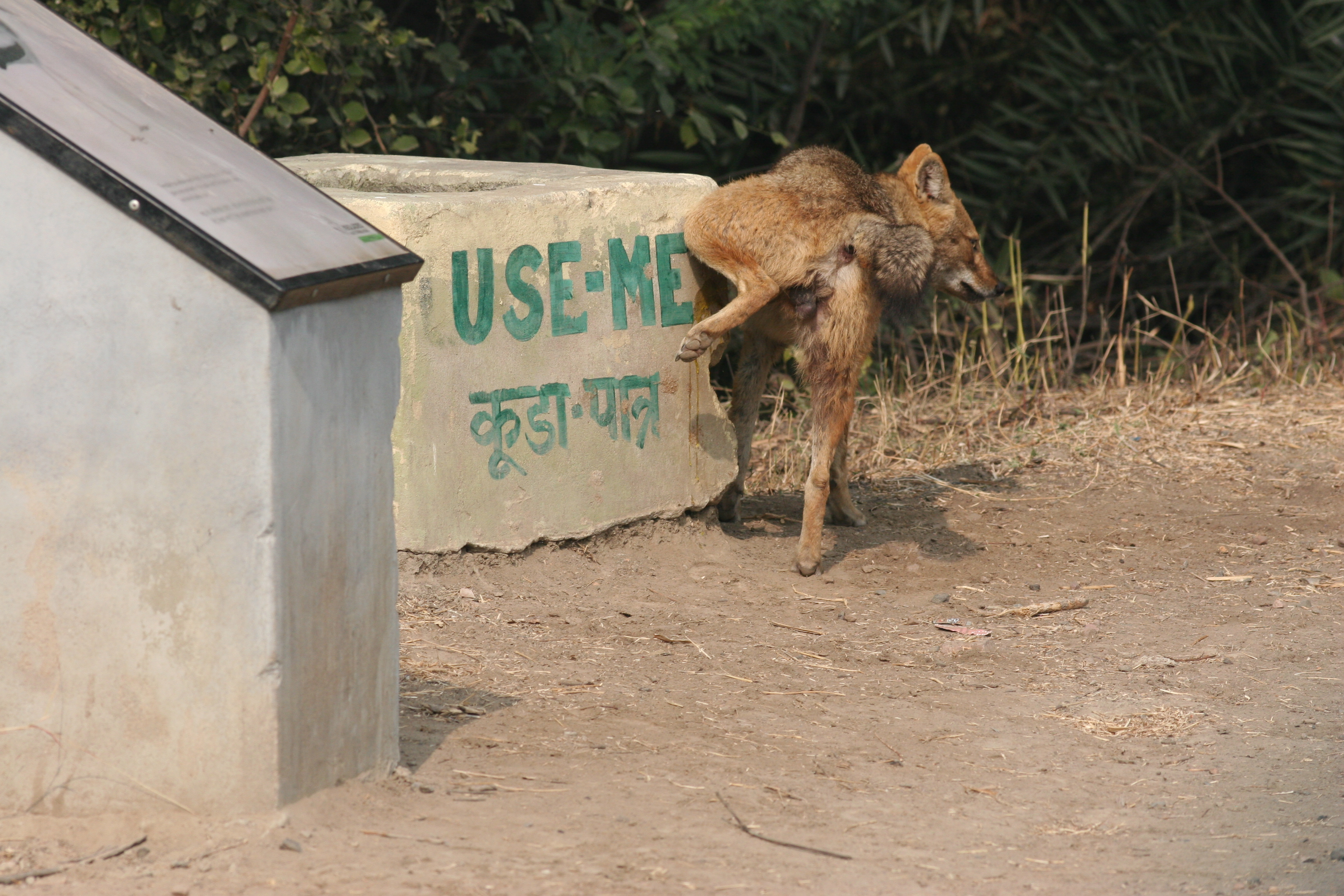
Jackals mark their territories with urine

In ethology, territory is the sociographical area that an animal consistently defends against conspecific competition (or, occasionally, against animals of other species) using agonistic behaviors or (less commonly) real physical aggression. Animals that actively defend territories in this way are referred to as being territorial or displaying territorialism.

Territoriality is only shown by a minority of species. More commonly, an individual or a group of animals occupies an area that it habitually uses but does not necessarily defend; this is called its home range. The home ranges of different groups of animals often overlap, and in these overlap areas the groups tend to avoid each other rather than seeking to confront and expel each other. Within the home range there may be a core area that no other individual group uses, but, again, this is as a result of avoidance.

Animals defend their territories to protect access to food, mates and nesting sites. Some species defend small sites while others control vast territories. Territorial dynamics may also change seasonally, often intensifying during breeding periods. Different species use a variety of strategies to guard their territory, including visual displays, olfactory marking, vocalizations and in some cases direct physical confrontation.

== Function ==
The ultimate function of animals inhabiting and defending a territory is to increase the individual fitness or inclusive fitness of the animals expressing the behaviour. Fitness in this biological sense relates to the ability of an animal to survive and raise young. The proximate functions of territory defense vary. For some animals, the reason for such protective behaviour is to acquire and protect food sources, nesting sites, mating areas, or to attract a mate.

== Types and size ==
Among birds, territories have been classified as six types.

- Type A: An 'all-purpose territory' in which all activities occur, e.g. courtship, mating, nesting and foraging
- Type B: A mating and nesting territory, not including most of the area used for foraging.
- Type C: A nesting territory which includes the nest plus a small area around it. Common in colonial waterbirds.
- Type D: A pairing and mating territory. The type of territory defended by males in lekking species.
- Type E: Roosting territory.
- Type F: Winter territory which typically includes foraging areas and roost sites. May be equivalent (in terms of location) to the Type A territory, or for a migratory species, may be on the wintering grounds.

Reports of territory size can be confused by a lack of distinction between home range and the defended territory. The size and shape of a territory can vary according to its purpose, season, the amount and quality of resources it contains, or the geography. The size is usually a compromise of resource needs, defense costs, predation pressure and reproductive needs.

Some species of squirrels may claim as much as 10 hectares (25 acres) of territory. For European badgers, a home range may be as small as 30 hectares (74 acres) in a good rural habitat, but as large as 300 hectares (740 acres) in a poor habitat. On average, a territory may be approximately 50 hectares (120 acres), with main setts normally at least 500 metres (1,600 ft) apart. In urban areas, territories can be as small as 5 hectares (12 acres), if they can obtain enough food from bird tables, food waste or artificial feeding in suburban gardens. Spotted hyenas (Crocuta crocuta) have highly variable territory sizes, ranging from less than 4,000 hectares (9,900 acres) in the Ngorongoro Crater to over 100,000 hectares (250,000 acres) in the Kalahari.

In birds, golden eagles (Aquila chrysaetos) have territories of 9,000 hectares (22,000 acres), least flycatchers' (Empidonax minimus) territories are about 600 square metres (6,500 sq ft) and gulls have territories of only a few square centimetres in the immediate vicinity of the nest.

Territories can be linear. Sanderlings (Calidris alba) forage on beaches and sandflats. When on beaches, they feed either in flocks or individual territories of 10 to 120 metres of shoreline.

The time to develop territories varies between animals. The marine iguana (Amblyrhynchus cristatus) is a lekking reptile. Males start to establish small display territories two months ahead of the mating season.

== Retaining a territory ==
Video of a tigress scent-marking her territory

Rather than retaining a territory simply by fighting, for some animals this can be a 3-stage process. Many animals create "sign-posts" to advertise their territory. Sometimes these sign-posts are on the boundary thereby demarcating the territory, or, may be scattered throughout the territory. These communicate to other animals that the territory is occupied and may also communicate additional information such as the sex, reproductive status or dominance status of the territory-holder. Sign-posts may communicate information by olfactory, auditory, or visual means, or a combination of these. If an intruder progresses further into the territory beyond the sign-posts and encounters the territory-holder, both animals may begin ritualized aggression toward each other. This is a series of stylised postures, vocalisations, displays, etc. which function to solve the territory dispute without actual fighting as this could injure either or both animals. Ritualized aggression often ends by one of the animals fleeing (generally the intruder). If this does not happen, the territory may be defended by actual fighting, although this is generally a last resort.

=== Advertising the territory ===
==== Scent marking ====
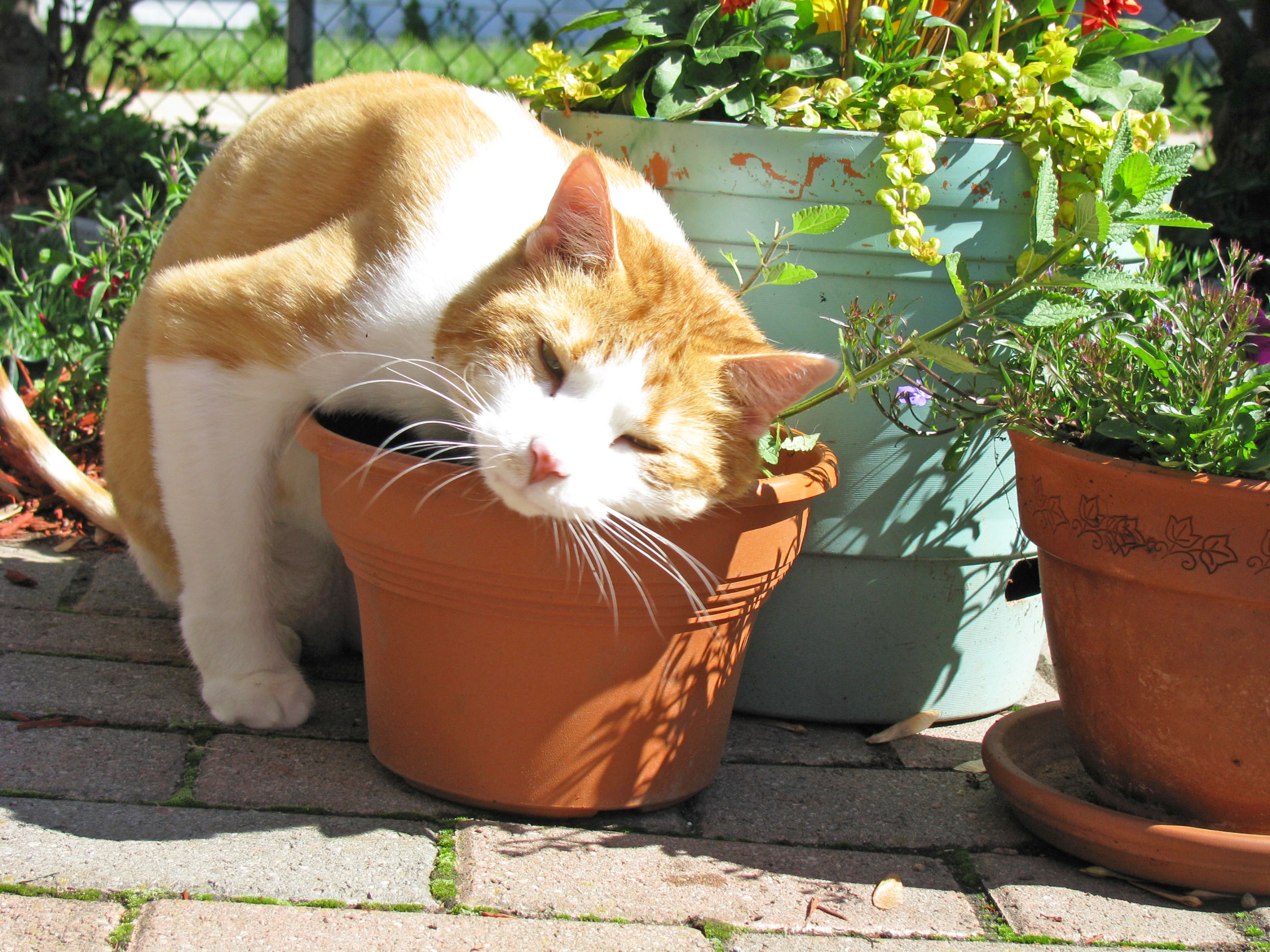
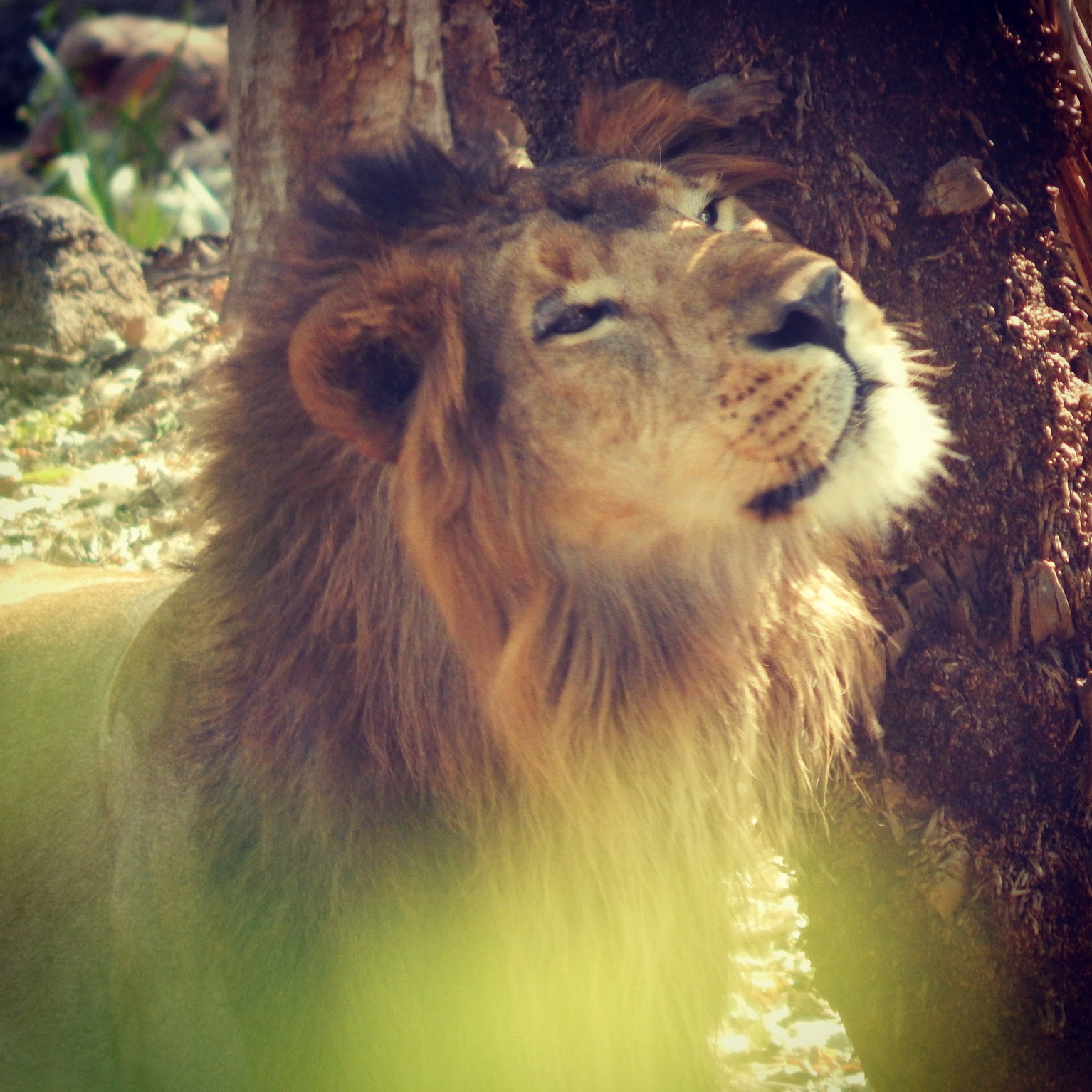
Felids rub their heads on vegetation
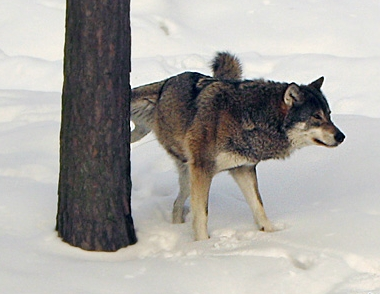
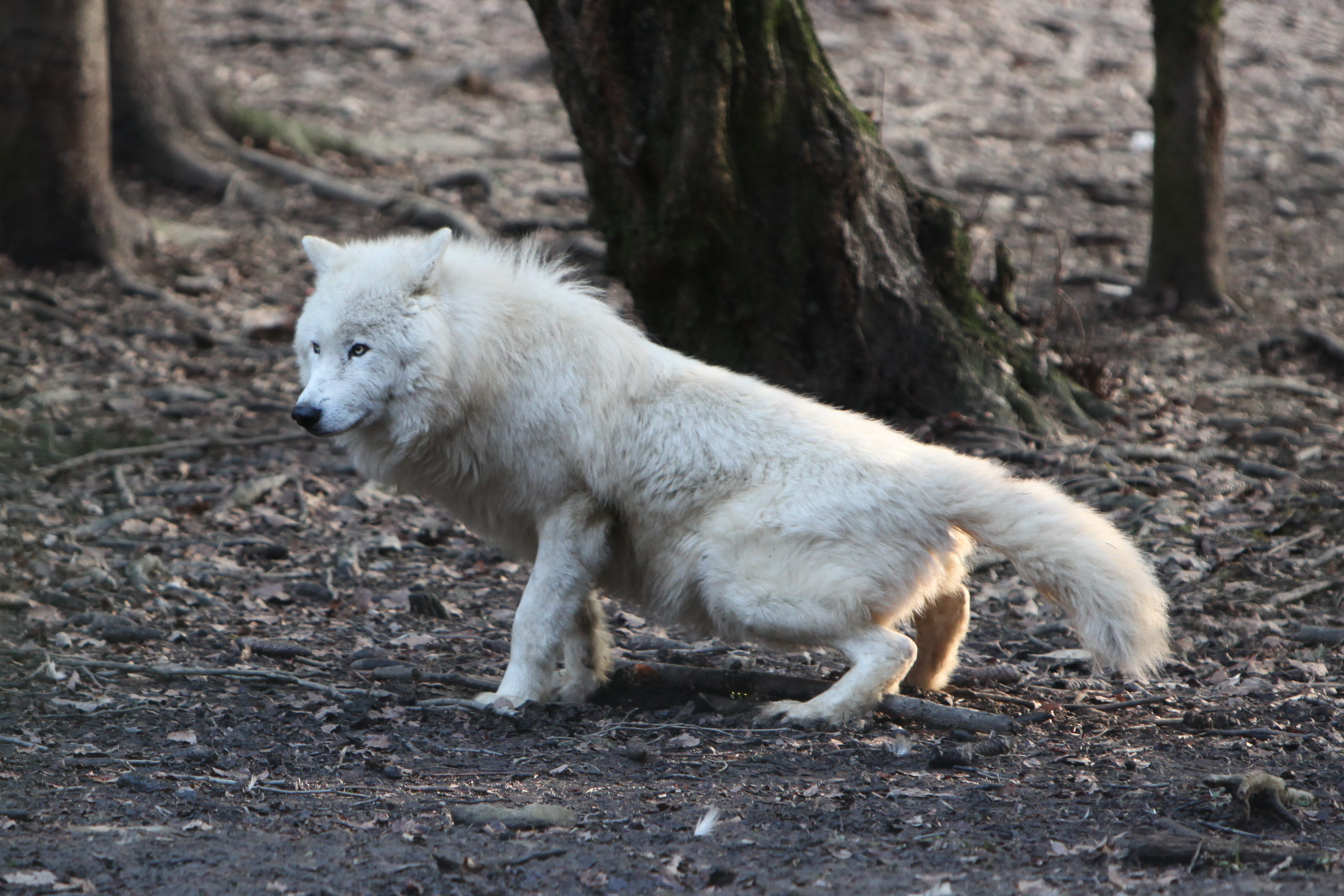
Wolves mark their territories with urine
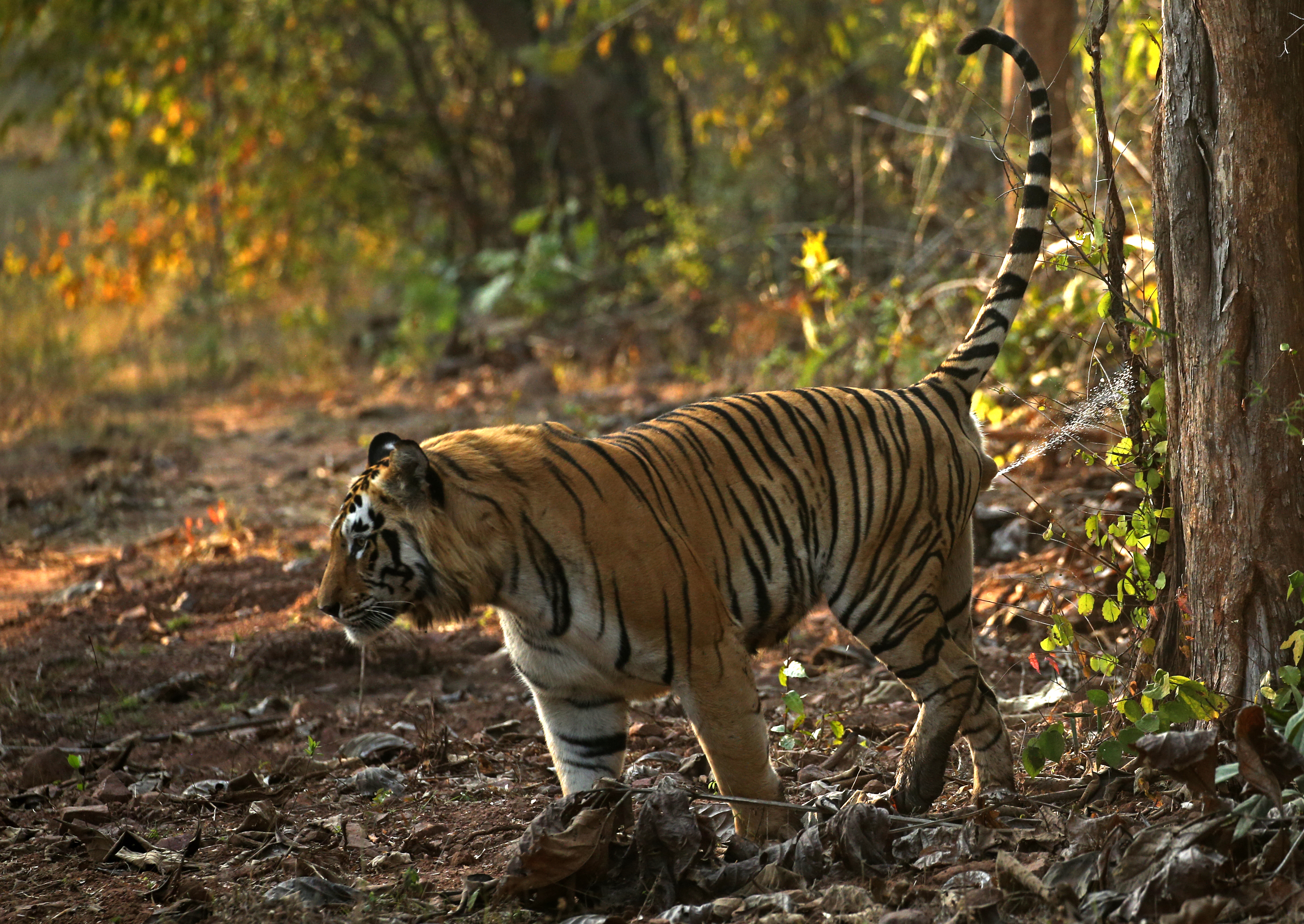
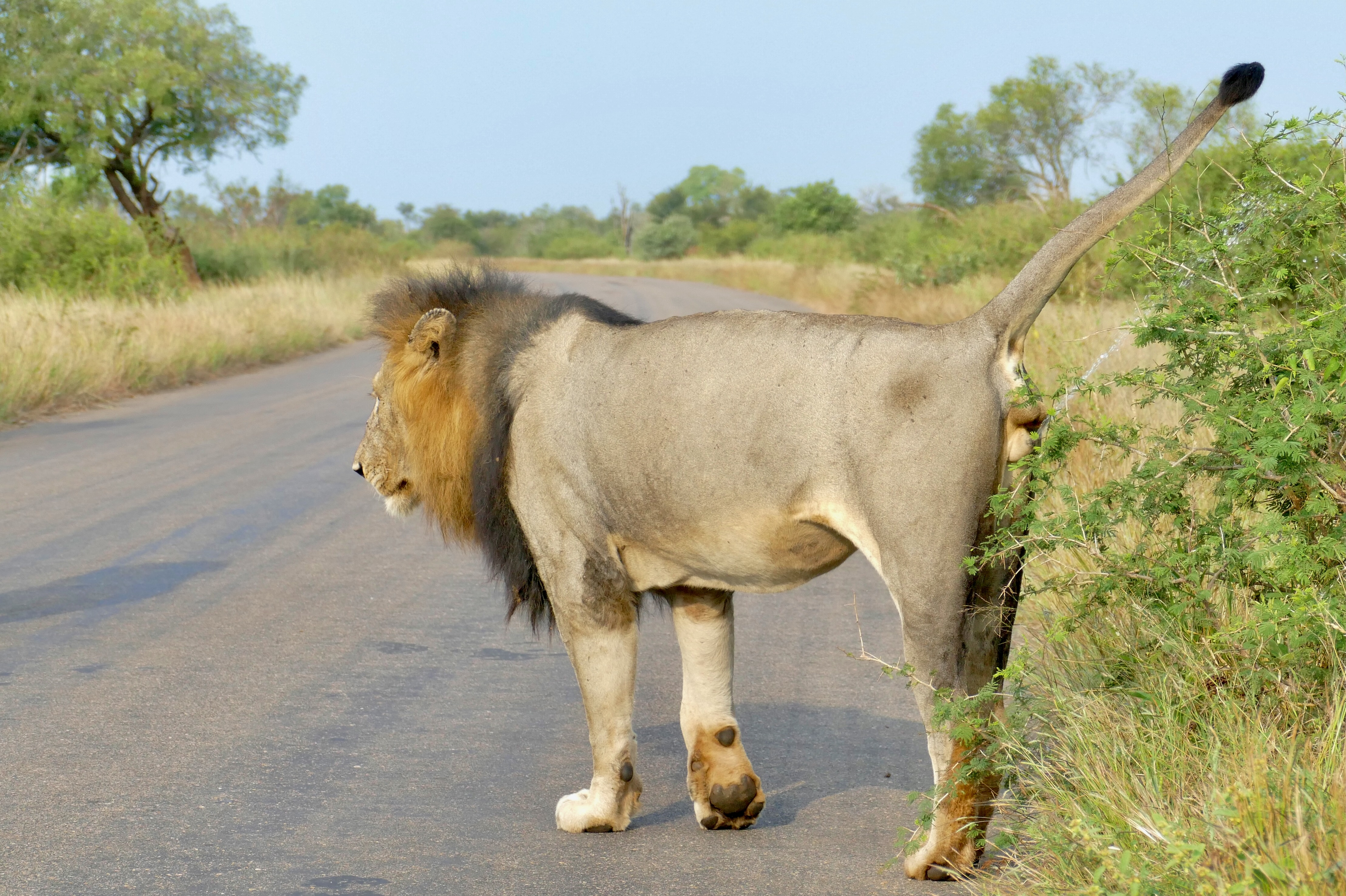
Tigers and lions spray urine on scent posts

Scent marking, also known as territorial marking or spraying when this involves urination, is a behaviour used by animals to identify their territory. Most commonly, this is accomplished by depositing strong-smelling substances contained in the urine, faeces, or, from specialised scent glands located on various areas of the body. Often, the scent contains pheromones or carrier proteins such as the major urinary proteins to stabilize the odours and maintain them for longer. The animal sniffing the scent frequently displays a flehmen response to assist in detecting the mark. Scent marking is often performed by scent rubbing in many mammals. In many mammal species, scent marking is more frequent during the breeding season.

Bears and felids such as leopards and jaguars scent-mark by urinating on or rubbing against vegetation. Prosimians and New World monkeys also use scent marking, including urine washing (self-anointing the body with urine), to communicate. Many ungulates, for example the blue wildebeest, use scent marking from two glands, the preorbital gland and a scent gland in the hoof.

Territorial scent marking may involve behaviours specific to this activity. When a wolf marks its territory, it lifts a hind leg and urinates on a scent post (usually an elevated position like a tree, rock, or bush). This raised leg urination is different from normal urination, which is done while squatting. This posture is exclusive to alpha wolves of either sex, although the alpha male does this most often. The alpha female usually urinates on a scent post that her breeding partner has just urinated on, although during the mating season, the female may first urinate on the ground. All other females in the pack, and also young wolves and low-ranking male wolves, urinate while squatting. Similar urination postures are used by coyotes and golden jackals.

Males and female ring-tailed lemurs (Lemur catta) scent-mark both vertical and horizontal surfaces at the overlaps in their home ranges using their anogenital scent glands. To do this, they perform a handstand to mark vertical surfaces, grasping the highest point with their feet while applying the scent.

In the Eastern carpenter bee, Xylocopa virginica, both sexes have glands that evolved for marking the nest. Males, although they have the gland, are unable to produce the marking substance. Females secrete it near the nest site entrance to establish their territory.

Wombats use feces to mark their territory. They have evolved specialized intestinal anatomy to produce cubical feces to ensure the feces do not roll away.

==== Visual ====
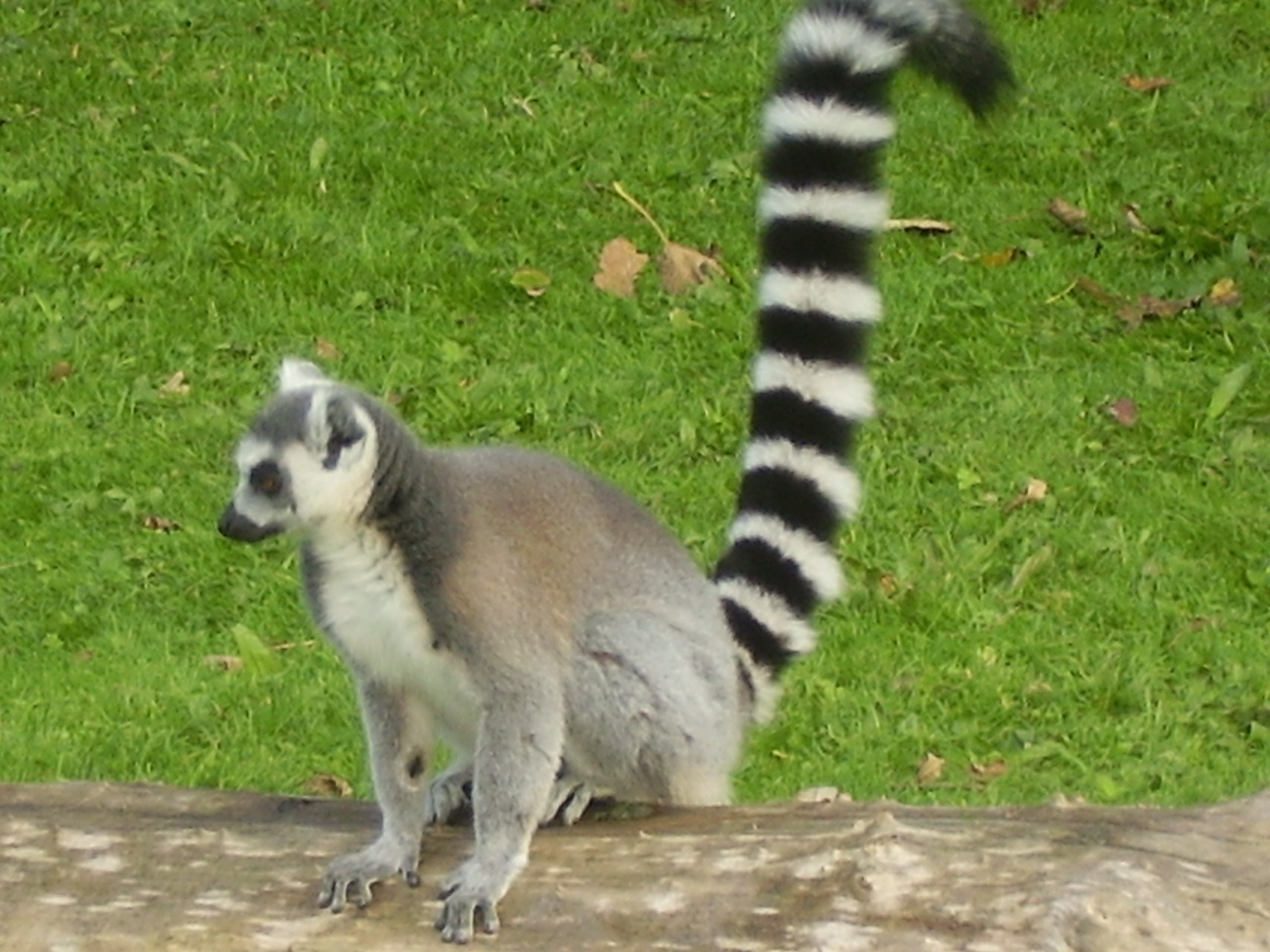
Ring-tailed lemurs hold their distinctive tails high in the air during territorial scent marking. They also engage in "stink fights" with intruding males.

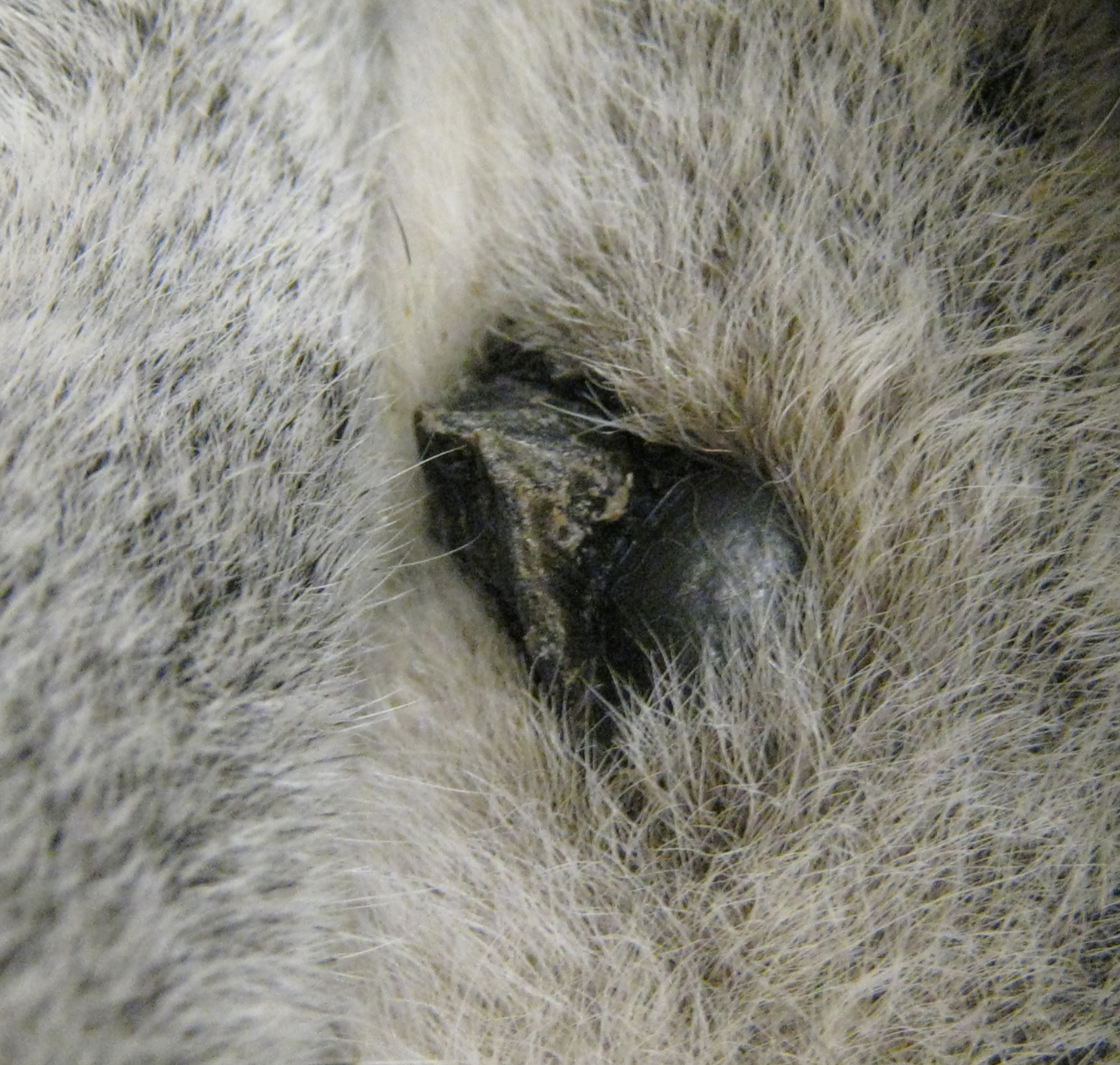
The antebrachial scent gland and spur on the forearm of a male ring-tailed lemur

Visual sign-posts may be a short-term or long-term mode of advertising a territory. Short-term communication includes the colouration or behaviour of the animal, which can only be communicated when the resident is present. Other animals may use more long-term visual signals such as faecal deposits, or marks on the vegetation or ground. Visual marking of territory is often combined with other modes of animal communication.

Some animals have prominent "badges" or visual displays to advertise their territory, often in combination with scent marking or auditory signals. Male European robins are noted for their highly aggressive territorial behaviour. They attack other males that stray into their territories, and have been observed attacking other small birds without apparent provocation. Such attacks sometimes lead to fatalities, accounting for up to 10% of adult robin deaths in some areas. The red breast of the bird (i.e. badge) is highly visible when it sings (vocal marking) at the boundary of its territory. The ring-tailed lemur (Lemur catta) advertises its territory with urine scent marks. When it is urinating for marking purposes, it holds its extremely distinctive tail high in the air adding a visual component to the advertisement; when it is urinating for eliminative purposes, its tail is only slightly raised.

Rhinoceros have poor vision but may use visual marking. Dominant white rhino bulls mark their territory with faeces and urine (olfactory marking). The dung is laid in well defined piles. There may be 20 to 30 of these piles to alert passing rhinoceroses that it is occupied territory. Other males may deposit dung over the piles of another and subsequently the sign-post grows larger and larger. Such a dung heap can become up to five metres wide and one metre high. After defecating, greater one-horned rhinos scratch their hind feet in the dung. By continuing to walk, they "transport" their own smell around the paths, thus establishing a scent-marked trail. Another method of visually marking their territory is wiping their horns on bushes or the ground and scraping with the feet, although this is likely combined with the smell of the marking animal. The territorial male scrape-marks every 30 m (98 ft) or so around its territory boundary.

After leaving a urination mark, some animals scrape or dig the ground nearby, thereby leaving a visual advertisement of the territory. This includes domestic dogs.

Several species scratch or chew trees leaving a visual mark of their territory. This is sometimes combined with rubbing on the tree which may leave tufts of fur. These include the Canada lynx (Lynx canadensis) and the American black bear (Ursus americanus). Many animals have scent glands in their paws or deposit fur during tree-marking, so tree-marking may be a combination of both visual and olfactory advertising of the territory. The male ring-tailed lemur has a specialised adaptation to assist in leaving visual/olfactory territorial marks. On their inner forearm (antebrachial) is a scent gland which is covered by a spur. In a behaviour called "spur marking", they grasp the substrate, usually a small sapling, and drag the spur over it, cutting into the wood and spreading the gland's secretions. When on the ground, ring-tailed lemurs preferentially mark small saplings and when high in the trees, they usually mark small vertical branches.

European wildcats (Felis silvestris) deposit their faecal marks on plants with high visual conspicuousness that enhances the visual effectiveness of the signal.

==== Auditory ====
Many animals use vocalisations to advertise their territory. These are short-term signals transmitted only when the animal is present, but can travel long distances and over varied habitats. Examples of animals which use auditory signals include birds, frogs and canids.

Wolves howling

Wolves advertise their territories to other packs through a combination of scent marking and howling. Under certain conditions, wolf howls can be heard over areas of up to 130 km^{2} (50 sq mi). When howling together, wolves harmonize rather than chorus on the same note, thus creating the illusion of there being more wolves than there actually are. Wolves from different geographic locations may howl in different fashions: the howls of European wolves are much more protracted and melodious than those of North American wolves, whose howls are louder and have a stronger emphasis on the first syllable.

=== Ritualized aggression ===
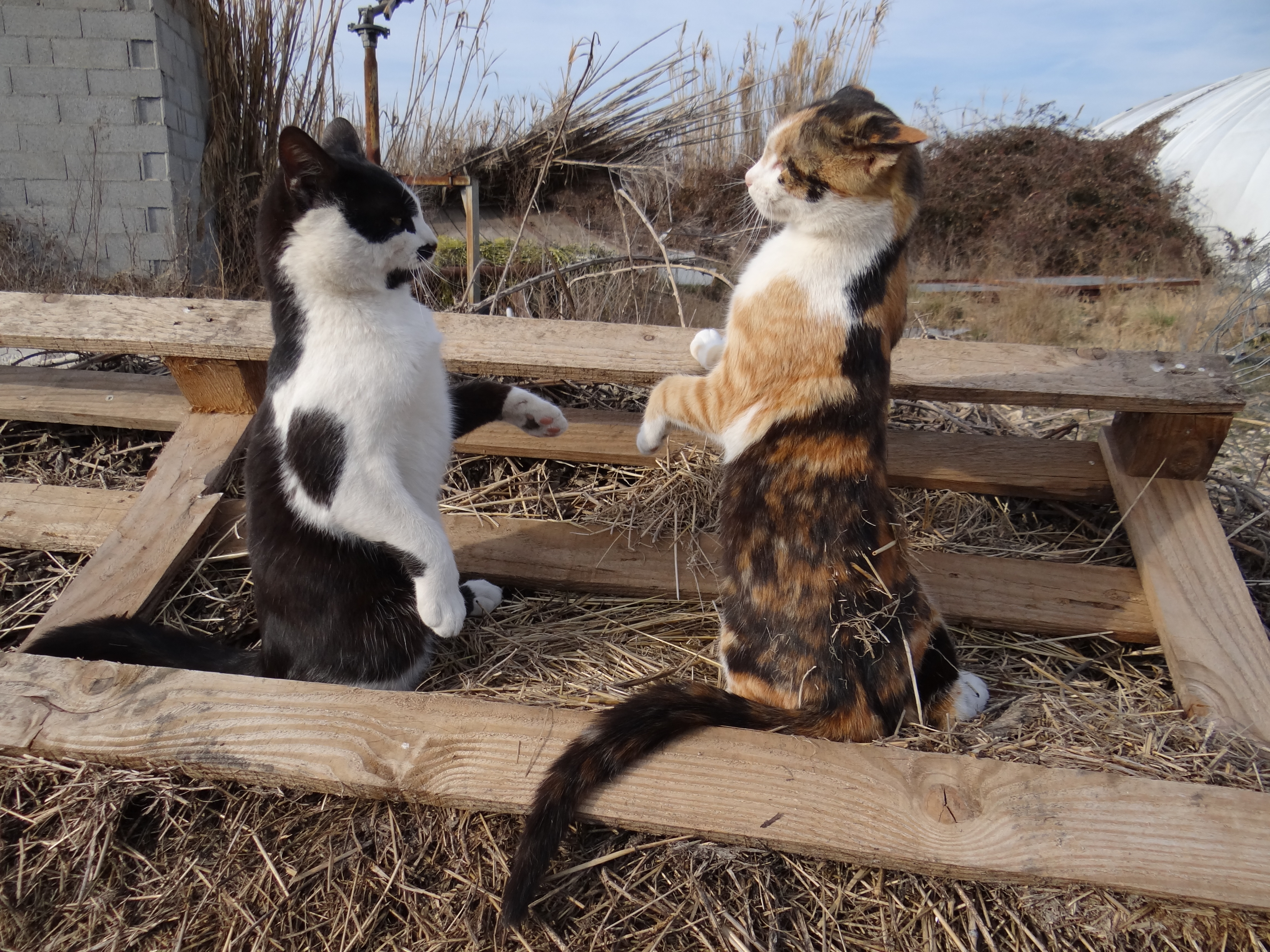
Two domestic cats posturing during ritualized aggression over a territory

Animals use a range of behaviours to intimidate intruders and defend their territories, but without engaging in fights which are expensive in terms of energy and the risk of injury. This is ritualized aggression. Such defense frequently involves a graded series of behaviours or displays that include threatening gestures (such as vocalizations, spreading of wings or gill covers, lifting and presentation of claws, head bobbing, tail and body beating) and finally, direct attack.

=== Defense ===
Territories may be held by an individual, a mated or unmated pair, or a group. Territoriality is not always a fixed behavioural characteristic of a species. For example, red foxes (Vulpes vulpes) either establish stable home ranges within particular areas or are itinerant with no fixed abode. Territories may vary with time (season). For example, European robins defend territories as pairs during the breeding season but as individuals during the winter. Cranes are usually gregarious in winter. However, some families that are caring for young establish and defend familiar territories against other families. Resource availability may cause changes in territoriality. For example, some nectarivores defend territories only during the mornings when plants are richest in nectar. In species that do not form pair bonds, male and female territories are often independent, i.e. males defend territories only against other males and females only against other females. In this case, if the species is polygynous, one male territory probably contains several female territories, while in some polyandrous species such as the northern jacana, this situation is reversed.

== Strategies ==
Animals may use several strategies to defend their territories.

The first game theory model of fighting is known as the hawk-dove game. This model pits a hawk strategy (always try to injure your opponent and only withdraw from the contest if an injury is received) against a dove strategy (always use a non-injurious display if the rival is another dove and always withdraw if the rival is a hawk).

Another strategy used in territory defence is the war of attrition. In this model of aggression, two contestants compete for a resource by persisting while constantly accumulating costs over the time that the contest lasts. Strategically, the game is an auction in which the prize goes to the player with the highest bid, and each player pays the loser's low bid.

Some animals use a strategy termed the dear enemy effect in which two neighbouring territorial animals become less aggressive toward one another once territorial borders are well-established and they are familiar to each other, but aggression toward unfamiliar animals remains unaffected. The converse of this is the nasty neighbour effect in which a territory-holder shows heightened aggression toward neighbouring territory-holders but unaffected aggression to unfamiliar animals or distant territory-holders. These contrasting strategies depend on which intruder (familiar or unfamiliar) poses the greatest threat to the resident territory-holder.

In territory defence by groups of animals, reciprocal altruism can operate whereby the cost to the benefactor in helping defend the territory is less than the gains to the beneficiary.

== Resources defended ==
An animal chooses its territory by deciding what part of its home range it will defend. In selecting a territory, the size and quality play crucial roles in determining an animal's habitat. Territory size generally tends to be no larger than the organism requires to survive, because defending a larger territory incurs greater energy, time and risk of injury costs. For some animals, the territory size is not the most important aspect of territoriality, but rather the quality of the defended territory.

Behavioural ecologists have argued that food distribution determines whether a species is territorial or not, however, this may be too narrow a perspective. Several other type of resource may be defended including partners, potential mates, offspring, nests or lairs, display areas or leks. Territoriality emerges where there is a focused resource that provides enough for the individual or group, within a boundary that is small enough to be defended without the expenditure of excessive effort. Territoriality is often most strong towards conspecifics, as shown in the case of redlip blenny. This is because the conspecifics share exactly the same set of resources.

Several types of resource in a territory may be defended.

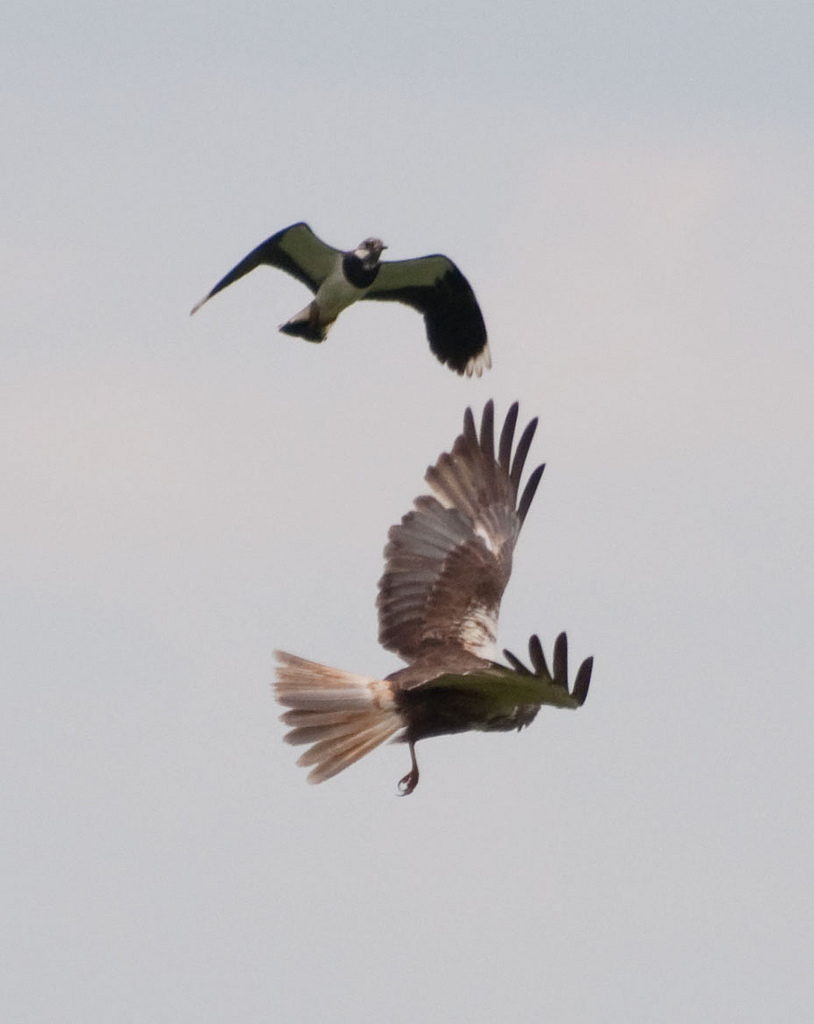
A western marsh harrier is mobbed by a northern lapwing. The marsh harrier, a male, had been quartering the ground in which lapwing and redshank were nesting.

Food: Large solitary (or paired) carnivores, such as bears and the bigger raptors require an extensive protected area to guarantee their food supply. This territoriality only breaks down when there is a glut of food, for example when grizzly bears are attracted to migrating salmon.

Food related territoriality is least likely with insectivorous birds, where the food supply is plentiful but unpredictably distributed. Swifts rarely defend an area larger than the nest. Conversely, other insectivorous birds that occupy more constrained territories, such as the ground-nesting blacksmith lapwing may be very territorial, especially in the breeding season during which they not only threaten or attack many kinds of intruders, but have stereotyped display behaviour to deter conspecifics sharing neighbouring nesting spots.

The owl limpet (Lottia gigantea) is a large (up to 8 cm in length) limpet. It lives in association with an approximately 1,000 cm^2 area of algal film in which its grazing marks can be seen, whereas the remainder of the rock surface is usually free of any visible film. These areas of algal film represent the territories of the Lottia; within them the animals do all their grazing. They keep their territories free of other organisms by shoving off any intruders: other Lottia, grazing limpets of the genus Acmaea, predatory snails, and sessile organisms such as anemones and barnacles.

Nests and offspring: Many birds, particularly seabirds, nest in dense communities but are nonetheless territorial in defending their nesting site to within the distance they can reach while brooding. This is necessary to prevent attacks on their own chicks or nesting material from neighbours. Commonly the resulting superimposition of the short-range repulsion onto the long-range attraction characteristically leads to the well-known roughly hexagonal spacing of nests. One gets a similar hexagonal spacing resulting from the territorial behaviour of gardening limpets such as species of Scutellastra. They vigorously defend their gardens of particular species of algae, that extend for perhaps 1–2 cm around the periphery of their shells.

The desert grass spider, Agelenopsis aperta, often engages in fights over its territory and the most combative spiders have the largest territories.

Some species of penguin defend their nests from intruders trying to steal the pebbles from which the nest is constructed.

Mating opportunities: The striped mouse (Rhabdomys pumilio) is group living with one single breeding male and up to 4 communally breeding females per group. Groups typically contain several philopatric adult sons (and daughters) that are believed not to breed in their natal group and all group members participate in territorial defence. Males defend their territory using a nasty neighbour strategy. Group-living male breeders are nearly five times more aggressive towards their neighbours than towards strangers, leading to the prediction that neighbours are the most important competitors for paternity. Using a molecular parentage analysis it has been shown that 28% of offspring are sired by neighbouring males and only 7% by strangers. In certain species of butterflies, such as the Australian painted lady butterfly and the speckled wood butterfly, the male defends territories that receptive females are likely to fly through such as sunny hilltops and sunspots on a forest's floor.

Territory defence in male variegated pupfish (Cyprinodon variegatus) is dependent on the presence of females. Reduced aggression consistent with the dear enemy effect occurs between conspecific neighbours in the absence of females, but the presence of a female in a male's territory instigates comparably greater aggression between the neighbours.

In the Skylark (Alauda arvensis), playbacks of neighbour and stranger songs at three periods of the breeding season show that neighbours are dear enemies in the middle of the season, when territories are stable, but not at the beginning of the breeding season, during settlement and pair formation, nor at the end, when bird density increases due to the presence of young birds becoming independent. Thus, this dear enemy territoriality relationship is not a fixed pattern but a flexible one likely to evolve with social and ecological circumstances.

Some species of bees also exhibit territoriality to defend mating sites. For example, in Euglossa imperialis, a non-social bee species, males have been observed to occasionally form aggregations of fragrance-rich territories, considered to be leks. These leks serve only a facultative purpose for this species, in which the more fragrance-rich sites there are, the greater the number of habitable territories. Since these territories are aggregated, females have a large selection of males with whom to potentially mate within the aggregation, giving females the power of mate choice. Similar behaviour is also observed in the Eulaema meriana orchid bee. Males in this species of bee show alternative behaviours of territoriality and transiency. Transient male bees did not defend territories, but instead flew from one territory to the other. They also did not engage in physical contact with the territorial males. On the other hand, territorial males patrolled an area around a tree and used the same territory for up to 49 days. It also appeared that they gave up territories to new males without violence. Males defend territories solely for mating, and no other resources such as fragrances, nests, nest construction materials, nectar, or pollen are found at these territories.

=== Single resource territories ===
Although most territories contain multiple (potential) resources, some territories are defended for only one purpose. European blackbirds may defend feeding territories that are distant from their nest sites, and in some species that form leks, for example in the Uganda kob (an antelope) and the marine iguana, males defend the lek site which is used only for mating.

== Polyterritoriality ==
Many species demonstrate polyterritoriality, referring to the act of claiming or defending more than one territory. In the European pied flycatcher (Ficedula hypoleuca), researchers assert that males exhibit polyterritoriality to deceive females of the species into entering into polygynous relationships. This hypothesis, named the deception hypothesis, claims that males have territories at distances sufficiently great that females are unable to discern already-mated males. The observation that males travelled long distances, ranging from 200m to 3.5 km, to find a second mate supports this argument. The debate about polyterritoriality in this species may initiate research about the evolution and reasons for polyterritoriality in other unrelated species.

== See also ==
- Aggression
- Alpha (biology)
- Biological interaction
- Border control
- Dear enemy recognition
- Home range
- Property
- The Territorial Imperative
