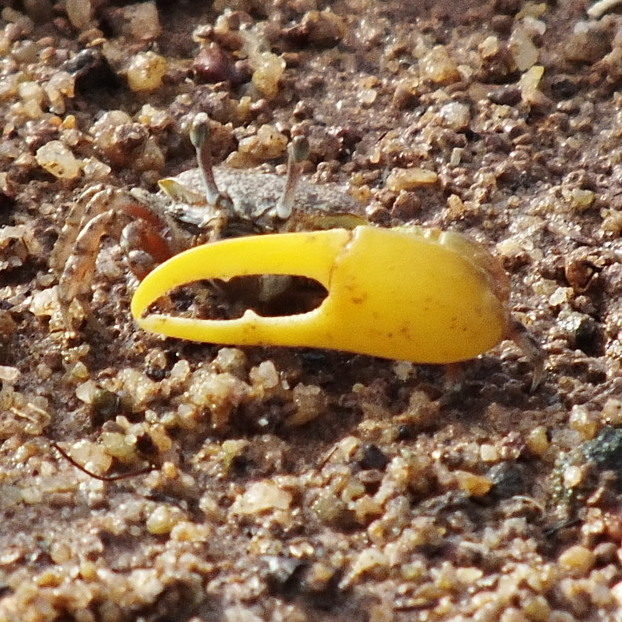
- Austruca mjoebergi, banana fiddler crab, Australia

Scientific classification
- Kingdom: Animalia
- Phylum: Arthropoda
- Clade: Pancrustacea
- Class: Malacostraca
- Order: Decapoda
- Suborder: Pleocyemata
- Infraorder: Brachyura
- Family: Ocypodidae
- Subfamily: Gelasiminae
- Tribe: Gelasimni
- Genus: Austruca
- Species: A. mjoebergi

Binomial name
- Austruca mjoebergi (Rathbun, 1924)

Synonyms
- Uca mjöbergi

= Austruca mjoebergi =

Species of crab

Austruca mjoebergi, also known as the banana fiddler crab, is a species of fiddler crab that is found along the north and northwest coast of Australia (approximately from Dampier to the Gulf of Carpentaria) and parts of Indonesia.

Austruca mjoebergi exhibits extreme sexual dimorphism. The greatest difference between sexes is that the males have a large brightly colored major claw and a smaller minor claw, whereas females have two similarly sized claws. They are relatively small crabs with the males slightly larger than females. A census of a population of Austruca mjoebergi gave the average carapace width of adult males 10.4 ± 1.3 mm and adult females 8.8 ± 1.0 mm. Male major claw length is tightly correlated with carapace width. The same population had average major claw length of the adult males of 14.9 ±4.3 mm.

== Competition and conflict ==
Male Austruca mjoebergi engage in conflict with other males at varying levels of aggression. At low levels of conflict, a male will use the back of his major claw to push another male's claw backwards. This may occur if a male encroaches on the border of another male's territory. The claw pushing can escalate to male crabs interlocking their major claws. These crabs engage in a grapple of pushing each other and jostling for position. During a grapple males sometimes attempt to position the major claw underneath the other male and flick the claw in an upwards motion to lift and topple their opponent. If conflict persists through grappling, one of the males may retreat to the burrow. At the highest level of aggression, the conflict continues in the burrow. Digging conflict involves digging, pushing, grappling and scraping. Eventually, one male will retreat from the burrow and leave the territory. In conflict males will sometimes be removed from their territories by an intruding "floater" male.

=== The dear enemy effect ===
The dear enemy effect is used to describe the differences in conflict between neighboring males, and conflict between resident and floater males. A resident male is a male that has claim to a territory. A floater male is a male that does not have a territory and is traversing looking for a territory. Males can become a floater through conflict or by abandoning a previous territory due to a lack of resources. A neighboring male is a male that occupies a nearby territory to another male's territory. Neighborly conflict often arises when a male approaches the border of the two territories. If a neighboring male approaches a resident male's territory, conflict usually results in one male losing a small segment of territory, or no change. Neighborly conflict rarely results in either male losing their territory entirely. However, when conflict arises instead between a resident male and a floater male there are greater consequences of losing. In resident-floater conflict eviction from the territory and the loss of all resources associated with the territory lost is frequent when the resident loses. A. mjoebergi males can differentiate between neighboring and unknown males and are less aggressive towards neighboring males than unknown males. Studies observing neighboring conflict and resident-floater conflict showed that resident-floater conflicts result in significantly longer engagements than conflict between neighbors. Neighboring conflicts and floater-resident conflicts are no more likely to progress to grappling or attempting to flip the opponent. However, conflicts between a resident and floater are significantly more likely to lead to digging conflict.

=== Claw bluffing ===
Male A. mjoebergi rely heavily on their enlarged claw to signal dominance and fighting prowess. Crabs which lose their large claw will occasionally regenerate a lighter, cheaper claw (requiring less energy to produce). Research has shown that crabs with these "cheap" claws are worse fighters than crabs with strong claws of a similar size. However, these crabs engage in a form of deimatic behaviour and will attempt to bluff signal dominance despite their limited fighting ability. Research has shown that they are just as effective at intimidating other crabs based on claw size alone.

== Habitat territory and burrows ==
A. mjoebergi inhabit intertidal mudflats along the northern northwestern coastline Australia and the northwestern coast of Papua New Guinea. A. mjoebergi form densely populated mixed-sex communities. In these communities, males claim small territories approximately 10–20 cm (3.9–7.9 in) in diameter. For males, a claim to a territory and burrow are an essential part of survival. Males dig into the mud, forming burrows. These burrows are used for a variety of purposes, including escape from predators, thermoregulation, mating, egg incubation, and as a source of water to wet their gills. Additionally, burrows provide essential refuge from rising water levels during high tides.

Burrows are also an essential component of this organism's habitat. Burrows provide many benefits to this organism, which include but are not limited to protection from predators; maintaining moisture around the gills when the tide gets low; important shelter during harsh weather; and serving as critical sites for mating.

== Mating selection and behaviors ==
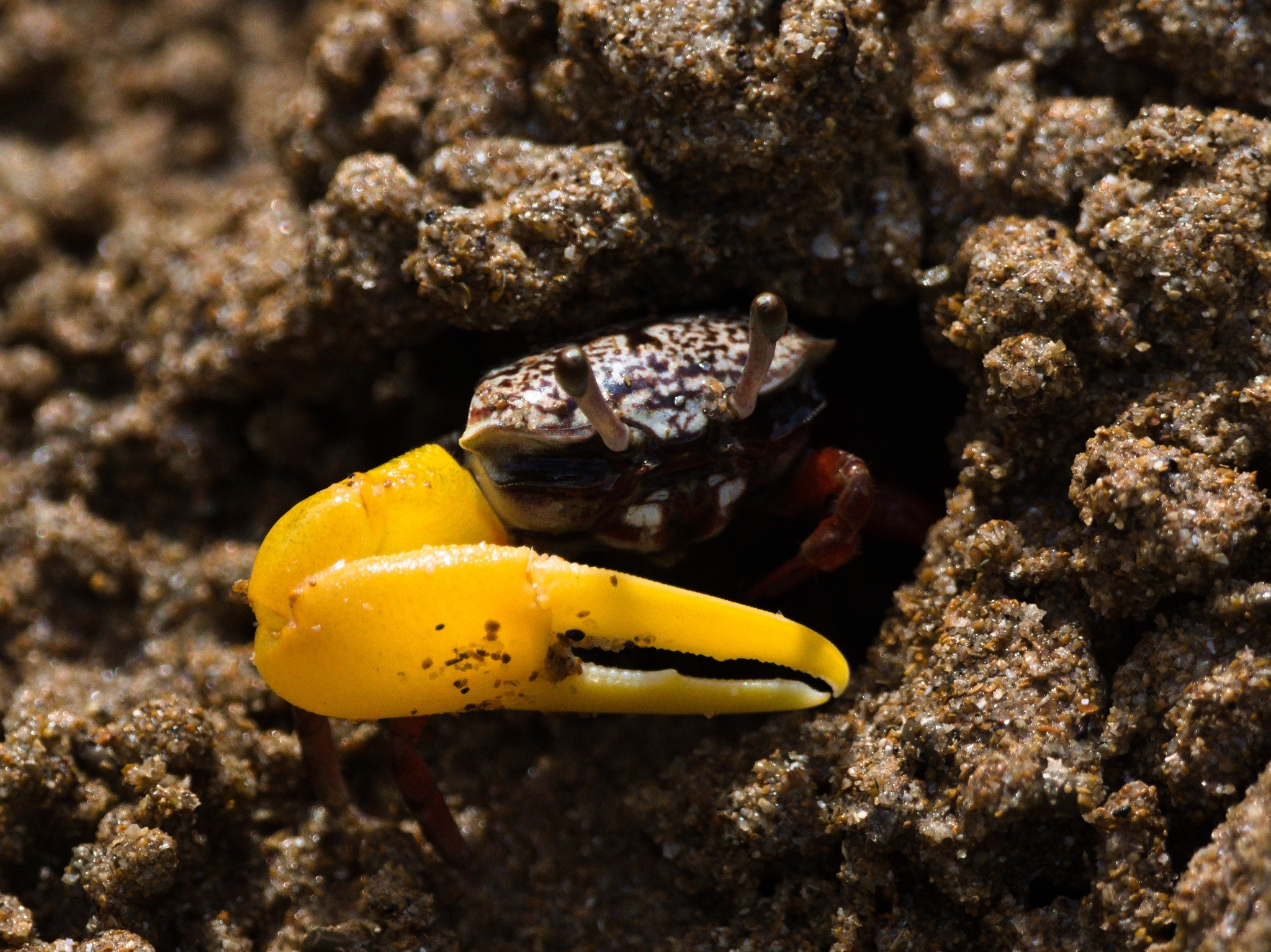
A male A. mjoebergi with a brightly colored claw

A. mjoebergi use their claws for several functions including showcases of dominance and during conflict. However, major claw use is not limited to conflict, males also use their major claws in courtship displays. Research has shown that males use their claws in natural mating behaviors. For a male crab to reproduce he must entice a female to approach and enter the burrow. To attract a female crab, male crabs perform a waving display and repeatedly raise their larger major claw upwards in a waving motion. When a female approaches a region of the population of males, the male A. mjoebergi form small clusters of 2–6 male crabs around the mate-searching female. The males compete between each other to display for the female. The female then evaluates the displays of the males and may choose to approach a male or to keep searching.

=== Male displays ===
Male crabs perform mating displays when in the presence of a mate-searching female. The male crabs wave their claws in the air repeatedly raising their major claw above their head in a beckoning motion. Experimental studies have shown that the male varies the waving depending on several factors. One factor that influences a male crab's waving is its male neighbors. Research has shown that male crabs with claws smaller than their neighbors' claws will wave less frequently in the presence of a female. Studies have shown on average a male approached by a female has a significantly larger claw than either of the two nearest neighboring crabs. However, when the approached male is instead compared to the two nearest neighboring crabs that also wave at the female, there was no significant difference in size of the major claw. The increased size of approached males' claws compared to non-approached males, may be due to neighbouring males being less likely to wave. When the length of claw was compared between waving males and non-waving males, the waving males had an average claw length 15.8 ± 3.0 mm, and non-waving males claw length of 13.4 ± 4.0 mm. The waving males on average have a larger major claw than non-waving males. Male crabs regulate whether to wave at a female depending on the neighboring males. Males with smaller major claws are more conservative when choosing whether to wave at a nearby female. Males not only regulate whether to wave or not but also the rate at which they wave. Once a female has chosen a male to approach, the male accelerates the rate of waving and begins to perform half-waves as the female moves closer.

=== Female mate choice ===
There are several required steps of recognition for a female to choose a mate. A female A. mjoebergi crab must be able to identify if an unknown male is conspecific or heterospecific. Researchers conducted an experimental study that involved painting the major claws of conspecific and heterospecific males. When the heterospecific male claw was painted to resemble conspecific claw, and the conspecific male claw was painted to resemble the heterospecific claw, the female preferred the heterospecific male (with conspecific coloration and pattern) in over 90% of instances. Female A. mjoebergi, use the coloration and pattern of the major claw of an unknown male to determine if a male is heterospecific or conspecific. The research also concluded that females exhibited a preference for unpainted conspecific males over painted conspecific males (painted a highly similar natural color). Despite a minimal color difference between the painted and unpainted male’s claws, the females showed a preference for the unpainted males. This may suggest that the female recognition of male A. mjoebergi is based in both pattern recognition and color recognition and differentiation.

When searching for a mate, female A. mjoebergi travel through the population across the inhabited mud flats. As the female travels throughout the mud flats, groups of 2–6 male crabs form clusters surrounding the female crab. The cluster of surrounding males perform wave displays at the female. Once the males have begun waving displays towards the female, the female begins to evaluate the males as potential mates. Female selection of a mate occurs in two phases. The first phase of selection occurs when the female selects a male based on his waving display. Studies have shown the female evaluates males on multiple selection criteria, including claw size and waving frequency. Research has shown that on average females will approach males with larger claws and a higher rate of waving. However, the rate of waving has a more significant effect than male claw size. If the female chooses a male, she will then follow the selected male to visit the burrow. The female will enter the male’s burrow and again evaluate the quality of the burrow. After evaluating the burrow, the female will choose to either stay in the male’s burrow and mate with him or leave the burrow and continue her search for a mate. Female crabs often visit several males' burrows in sequence.

Studies have shown that in addition to claw size and waving rate, females are also more likely to approach males that are closer than males significantly farther away. Females can see conspecific males at up to two meters away. However, research has shown experimentally when a female A. mjoebergi is placed at a distance greater than 60cm away from a male, the female is unlikely to approach the male. This holds true for males of varying claw sizes and waving rates. The clusters of male crabs that surround mate-searching females allow for females to evaluate several males within one proximity.

=== Synchronous waving ===
When performing for females, male A. mjoebergi regularly wave in synchrony with other males waving nearby. There are two leading explanations for the synchronous waves observed in waving males. The first is that female crabs prefer groups that wave in synchrony. This would result in all synchronously waving males receiving a mutual benefit of attracting more females to the group. The second is that synchrony is an accidental byproduct of males in competition. Research has shown support for the second possibility. Researchers used robotic crab models to test synchronous and asynchronous pairs of waving males. When females were presented with the crab models, if they chose to approach the asynchronous pair, they approached the “leader” significantly more frequently than the follower. Game theory models show that in a system that rewards males for being the leader of a wave, synchrony of waving males is produced as an epiphenomenon. Females are more likely to choose the leader; therefore, it is suggested that synchrony is an accidental product of competition.

== Taxonomy ==
A.mjoebergi was discovered by and named after the Swedish zoologist Eric Mjöberg (1882–1938), member of a Swedish scientific expedition to Australia in the early 1900s. It was formerly in the genus Uca, but in 2016 it was placed in the genus Austruca, a former subgenus of Uca.
