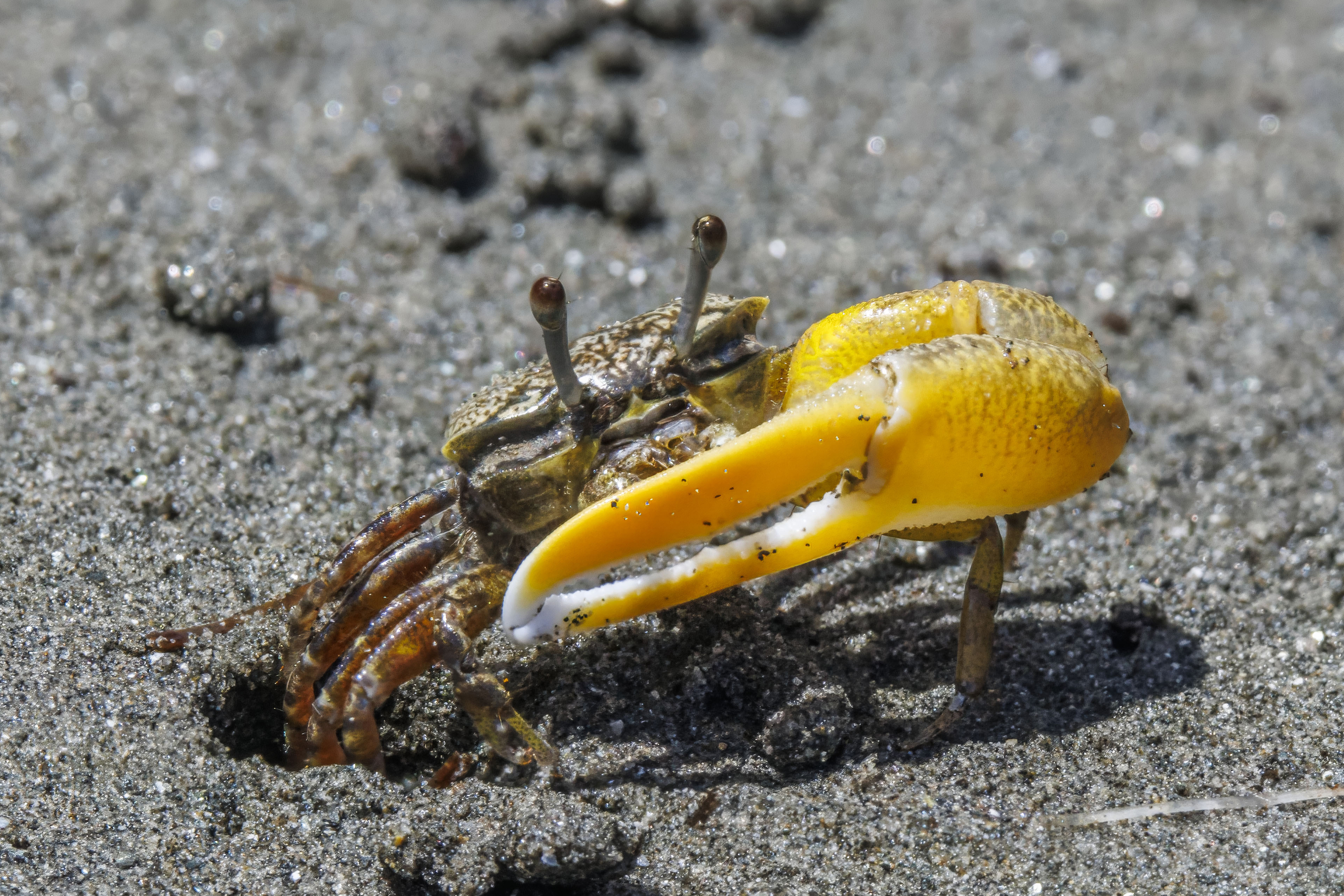
- Austruca citrus Citrus fiddle crab, Fiji

Scientific classification
- Kingdom: Animalia
- Phylum: Arthropoda
- Clade: Pancrustacea
- Class: Malacostraca
- Order: Decapoda
- Suborder: Pleocyemata
- Infraorder: Brachyura
- Family: Ocypodidae
- Subfamily: Gelasiminae
- Tribe: Gelasimni
- Genus: Austruca; Bott, 1973

= Austruca =

Genus of crabs

Austruca is a genus of Indo-west Pacific fiddler crabs in the family Ocypodidae. There are about 13 described species in this genus.

Austruca was formerly a subgenus of Uca, but in 2016 it was elevated in rank to genus.

== Species ==
These 13 species belong to the genus Austruca:

- Austruca albimana (Kossmann, 1877) (white-handed fiddler crab)
- Austruca annulipes (H.Milne Edwards, 1837) (ring-legged fiddler crab)
- Austruca bengali (bengal fiddler crab)
- Austruca citrus (citrus fiddler crab)
- Austruca cryptica (Naderloo, Türkay & Chen, 2010) (cryptic fiddler crab)
- Austruca iranica (Pretzmann, 1971) (Iranian fiddler crab)
- Austruca lactea (De Haan, 1835) (milky fiddler crab)
- Austruca mjoebergi (Rathbun, 1924) (banana fiddler crab)
- Austruca occidentalis (Naderloo, Schubart & Shih, 2016) (East African fiddler crab)
- Austruca perplexa (H.Milne Edwards, 1852) (perplexing fiddler crab)
- Austruca sindensis (Alcock, 1900) (indus fiddler crab)
- Austruca triangularis (A.Milne-Edwards, 1873) (triangular fiddler crab)
- Austruca variegata (Heller, 1862) (motley fiddler crab)
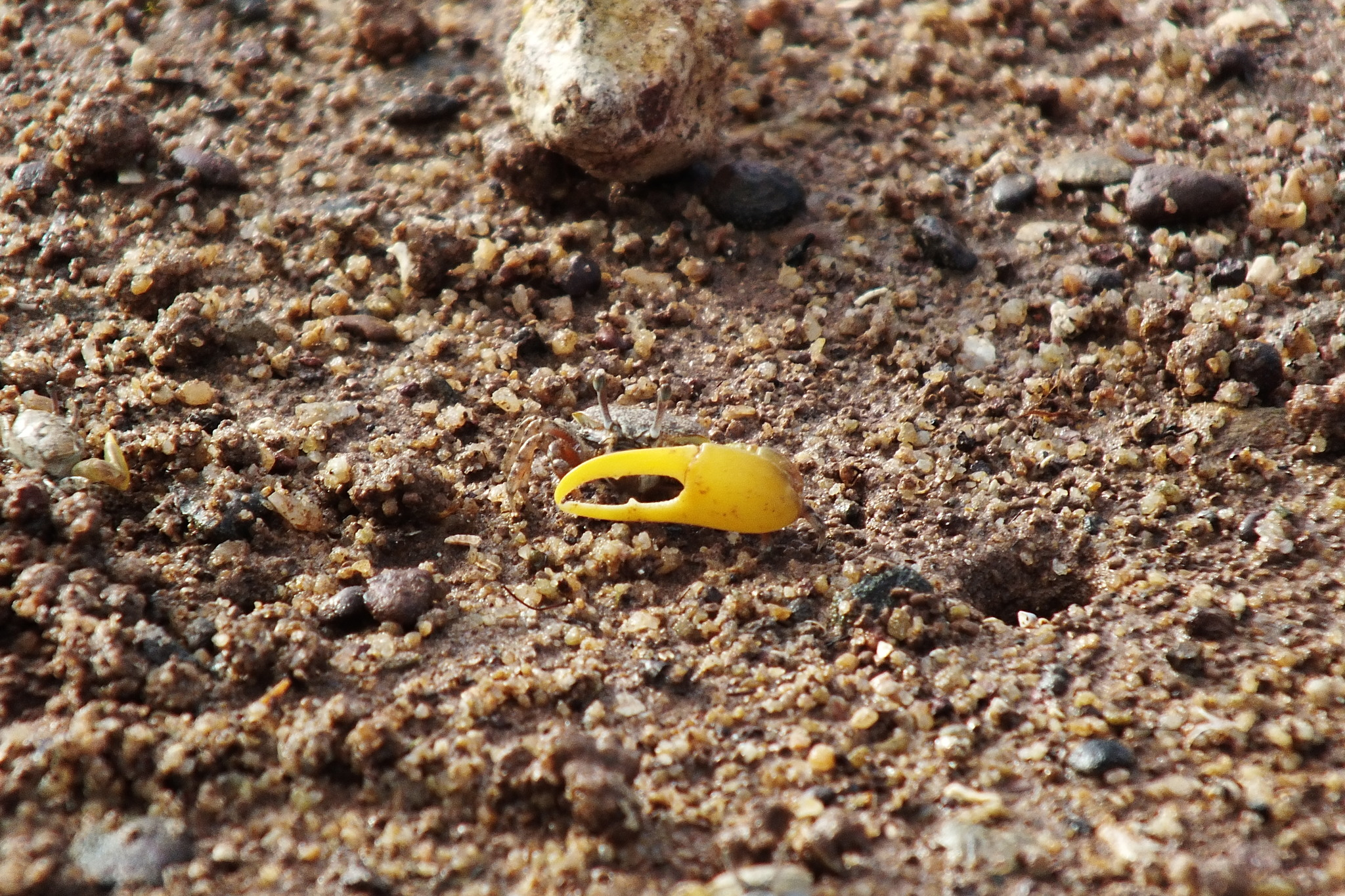
Austruca mjoebergi
Banana fiddler crab, Australia

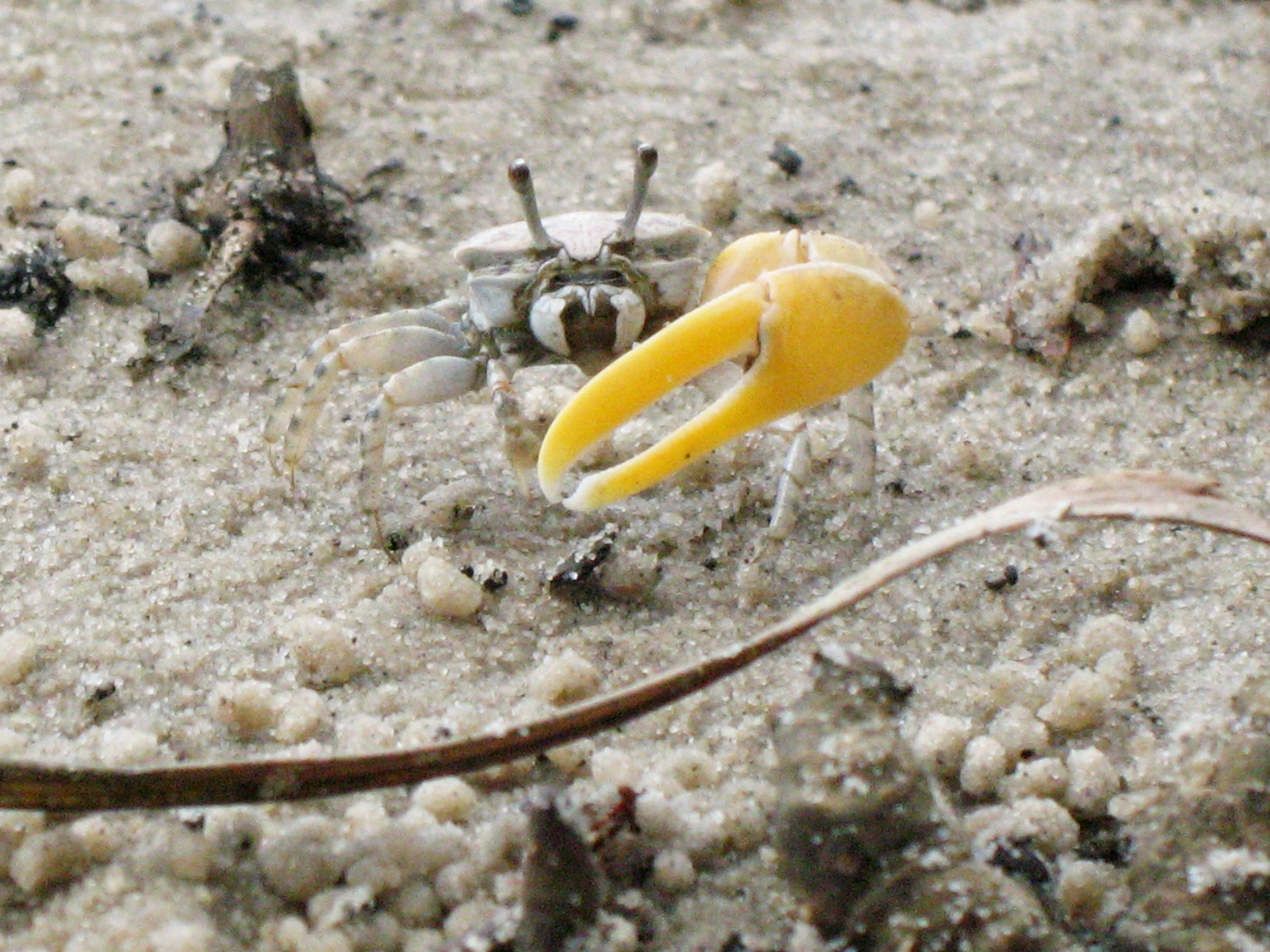
Austruca perplexa
Perplexing fiddler crab
Australia
