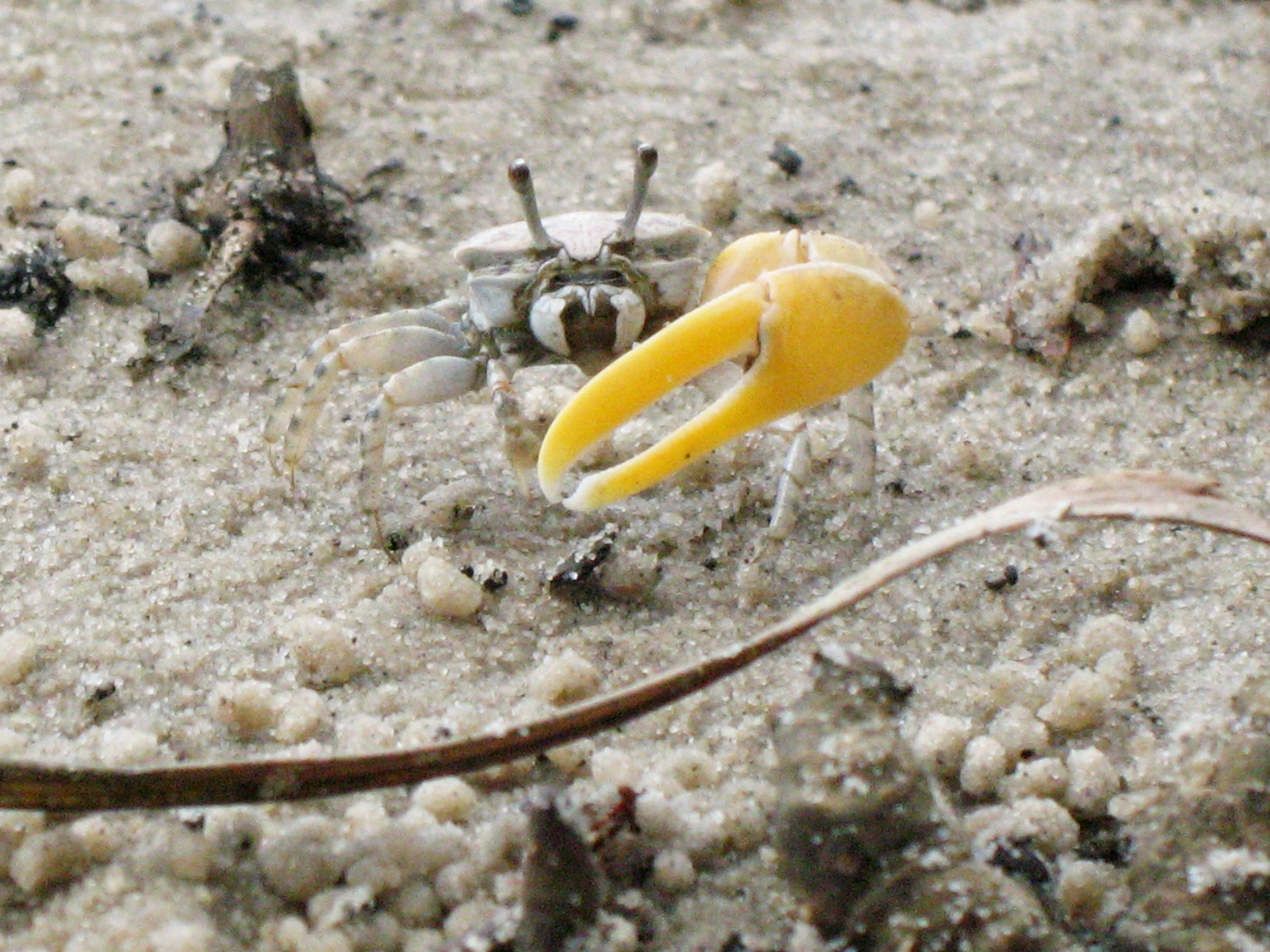

Scientific classification
- Kingdom: Animalia
- Phylum: Arthropoda
- Clade: Pancrustacea
- Class: Malacostraca
- Order: Decapoda
- Suborder: Pleocyemata
- Infraorder: Brachyura
- Family: Ocypodidae
- Subfamily: Gelasiminae
- Tribe: Gelasimni
- Genus: Austruca
- Species: A. perplexa

Binomial name
- Austruca perplexa (H. Milne-Edwards, 1837)

Synonyms
- Gelasimus perplexus H. Milne-Edwards, 1837; Uca annulipes var. albimana H. Milne-Edwards, 1852; Uca lactea perplexa (H. Milne-Edwards, 1837); Uca perplexa (H. Milne-Edwards, 1837)

= Austruca perplexa =

Species of crab

Male lemon-yellow clawed fiddler crab (Austruca perplexa), waving

Austruca perplexa is a species of fiddler crab. It is found from the Ryukyu Islands, Japan to India, throughout the Malay Archipelago, along eastern Australian coasts from Queensland to New South Wales, and in various Pacific islands, including Fiji, Tonga and Vanuatu.

Austruca perplexa was formerly in the genus Uca, but in 2016 it was placed in the genus Austruca, a former subgenus of Uca.

As in other fiddler crabs, the male has a greatly enlarged claw, which is used for signalling. The higher the claw is waved by the male, the greater his chance of attracting a female; the size of the claw is therefore subject to sexual selection. Furthermore, larger male fiddler crabs wave their claws at a faster rate than smaller fiddler crabs to attract larger females. Larger females are more desirable because they produce more eggs than smaller females.

Waving is a strategic behavior used by males to signal to females that they are a desirable mate. By using their claw they are communicating with females and the environment around them (including possible competition).

Austruca perplexa is usually found on sandy substrates near river mouths or on sheltered beaches in the mid-intertidal zone, usually near mangroves.
