= Dear enemy effect =

Territorial behavior in animals

The dear enemy effect or dear enemy recognition is an ethological phenomenon in which two neighbouring territorial animals become less aggressive toward one another once territorial borders are well established. As territory owners become accustomed to their neighbours, they expend less time and energy on defensive behaviors directed toward one another. However, aggression toward unfamiliar neighbours remains the same. Some authors have suggested the dear enemy effect is territory residents displaying lower levels of aggression toward familiar neighbours compared to unfamiliar individuals who are non-territorial "floaters".

The dear enemy effect has been observed in a wide range of animals including mammals, birds, reptiles, amphibians, fish and invertebrates. It can be modulated by factors such as the location of the familiar and unfamiliar animal, the season, and the presence of females.

The effect is the converse of the nasty neighbour effect, in which some species are more aggressive towards their neighbours than towards unfamiliar strangers.

== Function ==
The ultimate function of the dear enemy effect is to increase the individual fitness of the animal expressing the behaviour. This increase in fitness is achieved by reducing the time, energy or risk of injury unnecessarily incurred by defending a territory or its resources (e.g., mate, food, space) against a familiar animal with its own territory; the territory-holder already knows about the abilities of the neighbour, and also knows that the neighbour is unlikely to try to take over the territory because it already has one.

== Mechanism ==
The interaction between two neighbours can be modelled as an iterated prisoner's dilemma game. In this view, a territory owner that acts non-aggressively towards a neighbour can be thought of as cooperating, while a territory owner that acts aggressively towards its neighbour can be considered to have defected. A necessary condition for the prisoner’s dilemma game to hold is that an aggressive individual should enjoy greater benefits than a non-aggressive individual when each is faced with a non-aggressive opponent. This stipulation is plausible, as an aggressive individual might enlarge their territory or steal food or matings from a non-aggressive individual. When cooperation involves a cost, a possible mechanism for achieving stable co-operation is reciprocal altruism, where pairs of individuals trade bouts of cooperative behaviour with one another. Dear enemy cooperation could be explained by reciprocal altruism if territorial neighbours use conditional strategies such as tit for tat. In the tit-for-tat strategy, a subject will cooperate when its partner (neighbour) cooperates and defect when the partner defects.

== Occurrence ==
=== In mammals ===
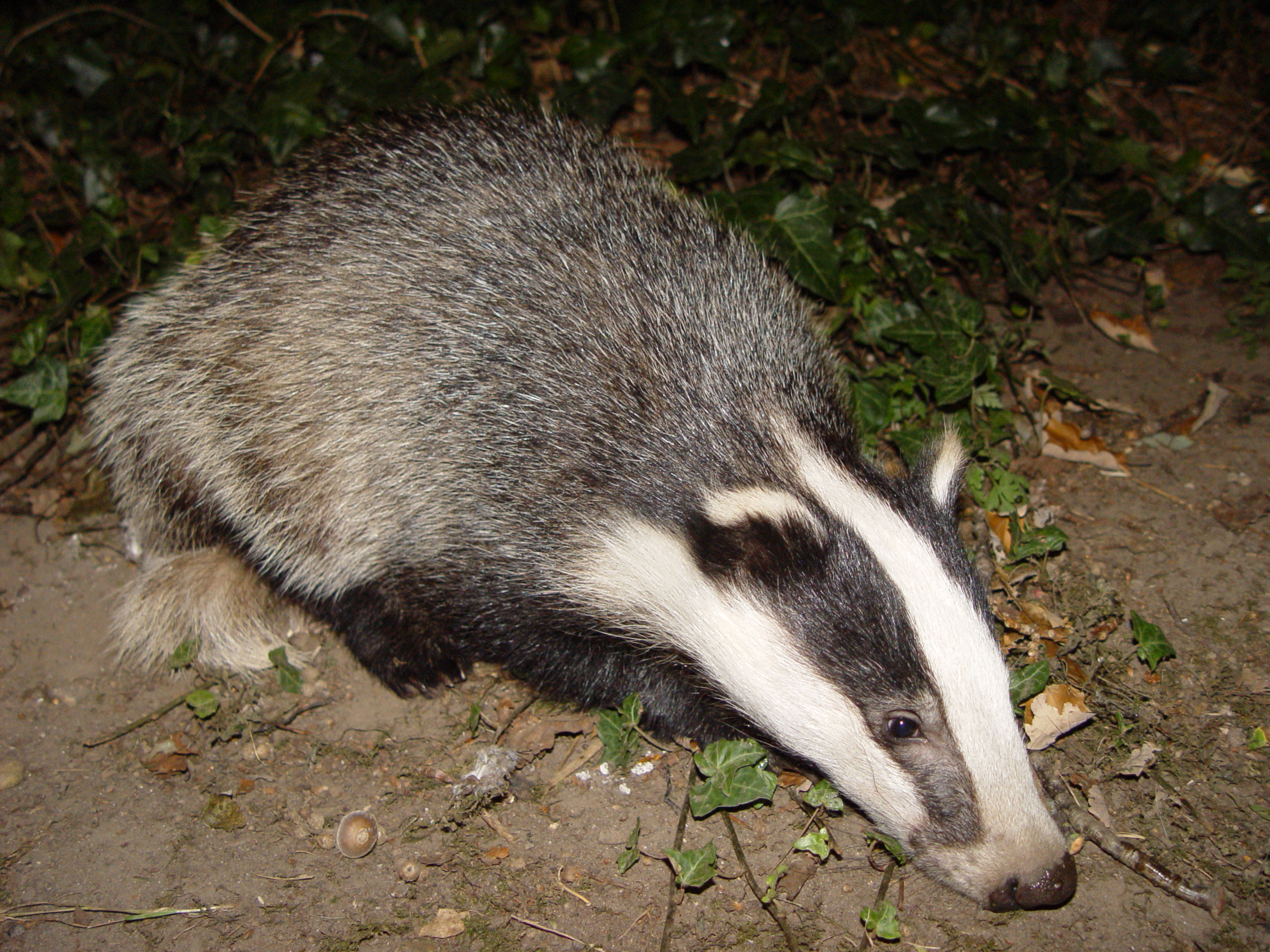
Eurasian badgers respond less aggressively to the scent of familiar conspecifics than unfamiliar

Territorial Eurasian beavers (Castor fiber) presented with a two-way choice sniffed both castoreum and anal gland secretion from a stranger longer than from a neighbour. Furthermore, beavers responded aggressively—standing on the mound on their hind feet, pawing, overmarking, or a combination of these—longer to castoreum, but not to anal gland secretion, from a stranger than from a neighbour. When the mounds containing the scents were allowed to remain overnight and the beavers' responses measured the following morning, the beavers' responses were stronger to both castoreum and anal gland secretion from a stranger than from a neighbour.

Eurasian badgers (Meles meles) can discriminate between self-, neighbour- and unfamiliar- group faeces near their main sett. Badgers show heightened behavioural responses towards unfamiliar- compared with self-group scents, but there is no difference in response to neighbour- relative to self-group scents. The relative responses towards unfamiliar-group scents are greatest during the breeding seasons, but there is no seasonal differences in the responses to neighbour-group versus self-group scents. In badger populations, levels of aggression between neighbouring territory-holders are likely to be kept relatively low through neighbour recognition. However, increased levels of aggression will be shown towards dispersing or itinerant (alien) badgers, especially during periods such as the breeding season when the potential threats to the long-term fitness of territory owners are greatest.

Red squirrels are able to discriminate the odours of familiar neighbours and strangers. It has been suggested that this discrimination may be used by males to avoid unnecessary chases and fights by becoming known to their neighbours.

=== In birds ===
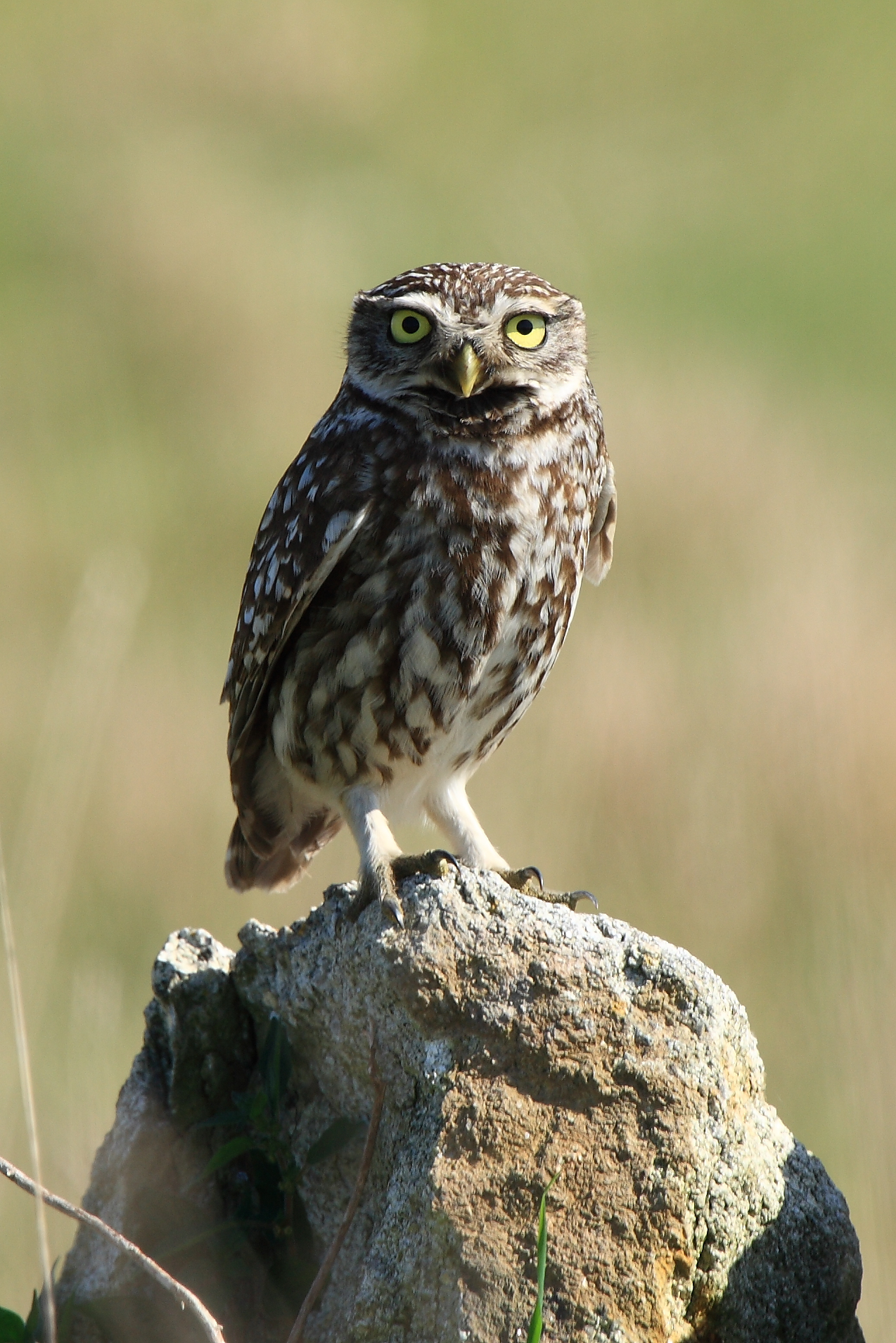
The little owl hoots less intensively at familiar neighbours than unfamiliar

Audio playback studies are often used to test the dear enemy effect in birds. These studies have demonstrated several bird species respond more aggressively to played back songs of strangers than to songs of neighbours; such species include the alder flycatcher (Empidonax alnorum), male blue grouse, European robin (Erithacus rubecula), and male banded wren (Thryothorus pleurostictus).

Neighbouring male song sparrows (Melodia melospiza) differ individually in their aggressiveness. Increased aggression by residents towards intruders indicates that residents not only respond to intrinsic aggressiveness of their neighbours, but also to short-term changes in aggression levels.

Although neighbour–stranger discrimination has been reported in many passerine birds, it has seldom been investigated in territorial non-passerine species. The nocturnal raptor, the little owl (Athene noctua), hoots to defend its territory. Male little owls respond less to their neighbour's hoots played back from the usual location. However, responses to playback of a neighbour from an unusual location are similar to responses to playback of a stranger's hoots from either location.

During the breeding season of the skylark (Alauda arvensis), particular common sequences of syllables (phrases) are produced by all males established in the same location (neighbours), whereas males of different locations (strangers) share only few syllables. Playback experiments provided evidence for neighbour–stranger discrimination consistent with the dear enemy effect, indicating that shared sequences were recognised and identified as markers of the group identity. Studies have shown that the dear enemy effect changes during the breeding season of the skylark. Playbacks of neighbour and stranger songs at three periods of the breeding season show that neighbours are dear enemies in the middle of the season, when territories are stable, but not at the beginning of the breeding season, during settlement and pair formation, nor at the end, when bird density increases due to the presence of young birds becoming independent. In song sparrows, where neighbours are most often the sires of extra-pair offspring, males will alter their aggression toward neighbouring males with their female's fertility status. When presented with simulated stranger and neighbour intruders during their female's pre-fertile and post-fertile periods, males displayed the dear enemy effect. However, when presented with simulated stranger and neighbour intruders during their female's fertile period, males exhibited an equal response to both stimuli, likely in order to protect their paternity. Thus, the dear enemy relationship is not a fixed pattern but a flexible one likely to evolve with social and ecological circumstances.

=== In reptiles ===
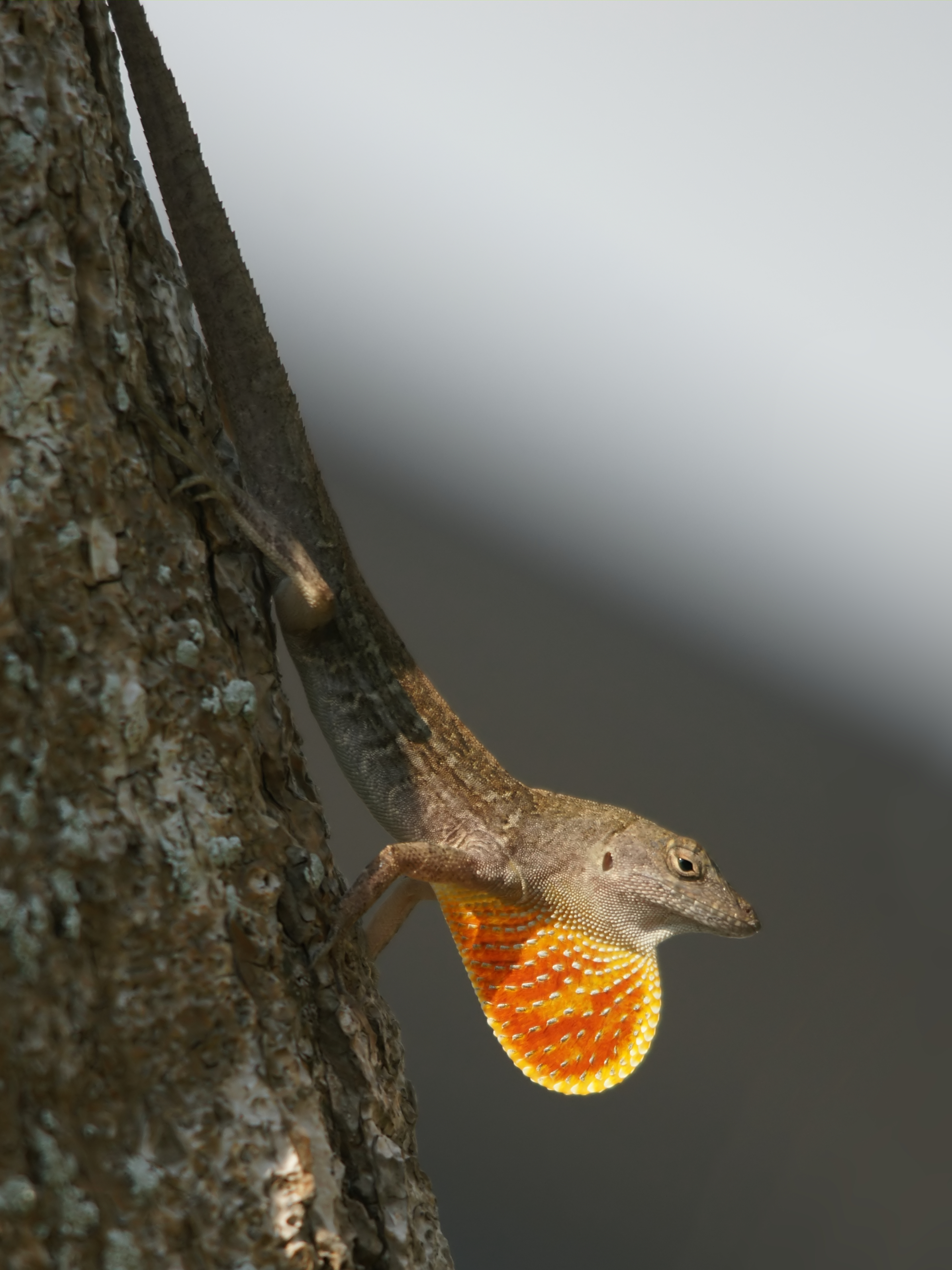
A brown anole displaying with its dewlap

Males of a territorial lizard, the tawny dragon (Ctenophorus decresii), reduced their aggression levels in repeat interactions with familiar rivals and increased their aggression levels towards unfamiliar males. The time taken for interactions to be settled was also lower towards familiar than unfamiliar males.

Another territorial lizard, the common collared lizard (Crotaphytus collaris), can individually recognize neighbours and will increase aggression towards them as the threat to territorial ownership increases. Resident males treat familiar neighbours that had been moved to the opposite boundary to the shared boundary as equally aggressive as strangers. However, residents responded more aggressively towards strangers than towards neighbours on natural territories and also in neutral arena encounters.

In the brown anole lizard (Anolis sagrei), dyads of males behave differently depending on whether the lizards are prior neighbours, with prior neighbours exhibiting less bobbing relative to nodding forms of headbob displays than non-neighbours.

The Iberian wall lizard (Podarcis hispanicus) has been observed to be less aggressive towards conspecifics. It also exhibits headbob activity similar to that of the brown anole.

=== In amphibians ===
Males of the territorial breeding agile frog (Rana dalmatina), have a large variability in call characteristics and are able to discriminate between neighbouring and unfamiliar conspecifics. Calling is of the longest duration in response to an unfamiliar acoustic stimulus; in contrast, the response to a familiar conspecific call does not show any difference from solitary vocalisations. Terrestrial red-backed salamanders, Plethodon cinereus, defend territories under rocks and logs on the forest floor in the eastern United States. Individuals are more aggressive to unfamiliar salamanders than to familiar individuals. In the golden rocket frog, there is variability in the nature of the call and the frog presents a more aggressive call to strangers in comparison to the response to its neighbors.

=== In fish ===
The dear enemy effect in male variegated pupfish (Cyprinodon variegatus) is dependent on the presence of females. Reduced aggression consistent with dear enemy recognition occurs between conspecific neighbours in the absence of females, but the presence of a female in a male's territory instigates comparably greater aggression between the neighbours.

Some researchers have staged three-way contests between male convict cichlids (Cichlasoma nigrofasciatum) to examine the dear enemy effect. When faced with a familiar neighbour and an unfamiliar intruder simultaneously, residents preferentially confronted the unfamiliar opponent. That is, the establishment of dear enemy recognition between a resident and a neighbour allowed the resident to direct his aggression to the greater competitive threat, i.e. the intruder.

Individual recognition of noises produced males of the bicolor damselfish (Pomacentrus partitus) have been demonstrated in the field. Playbacks of non-resident sounds from a given fish's territory elicit a greater response from its nearest neighbour than playbacks of the resident's sound. Testing also included switching the sounds of the two nearest neighbours relative to each respective male's territory. Results demonstrated that all males in the colony individually recognize the sounds of their two nearest neighbours.

=== In invertebrates ===
The home ranges of colony living ants often overlap the ranges of other conspecific colonies and colonies of other species. In laboratory experiments, the frequency and severity of agonistic interactions among workers from different colonies increases with the distance between their nests; this has been reported for Leptothorax nylanderi and Pheidole ants. In the wild, male bees of the species Xylocopa micans have been known to slowly fly into the territory of an adjacent male territory holder in order to test and establish the mutual boundary of their two territories.

The dear enemy effect has been reported in colonies of the fungus-growing termite Macrotermes falciger. Behavioural tests with workers reveal no alarm behaviour or mortality in pairings of workers from the same colony but a full range from no alarm to overt aggression, with associated death, when individuals were paired from different colonies. The level of mortality increases with differences in the composition of cuticular hydrocarbons between colonies.

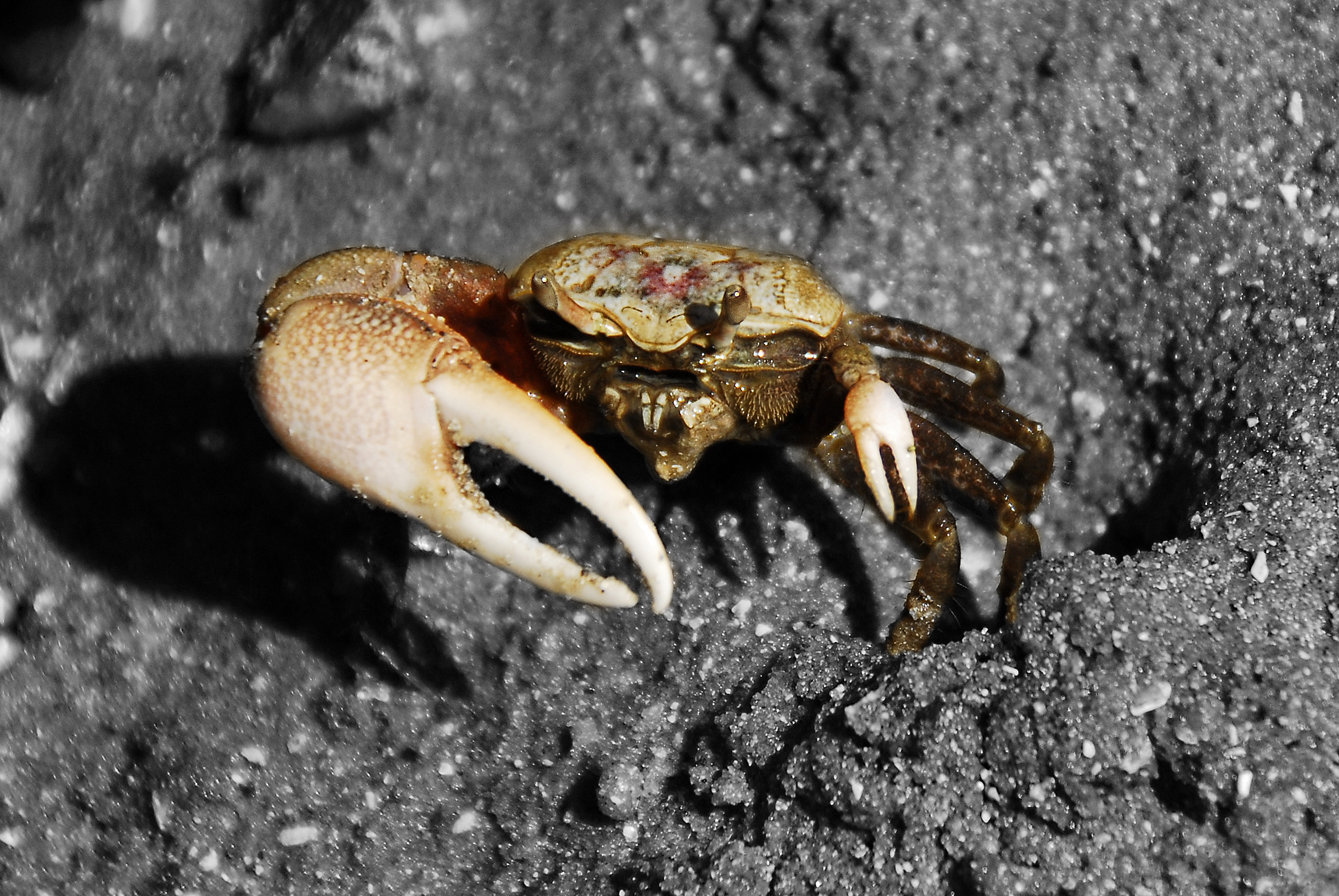
Male sand fiddler crabs attract mates by waving

The dear enemy effect has been documented in several species of fiddler crabs including sand fiddler crabs (Uca pugilator) and banana fiddler crabs (Austruca mjoebergi). In these species males defend territories that consist of a breeding burrow and a display area where they wave their claw to attract females. Burrow-holding males engage in agonistic contests with both intruding males that attempt burrow take-overs and with other territory-holding neighbours that apparently attempt to limit waving or other surface activities of rivals. Contests consist of one or more behavioural elements that range from no claw contact to use of the claw to push, grip, or flip an opponent. In the field, contests with intruders begin at higher intensities and escalate more rapidly than those with neighbours. However, resident–resident contests increase in intensity when burrows are close, neighbours faced each other when exiting burrows, and neighbours were of similar size. Proximity and orientation determine the ease with which a neighbour may be engaged.

== Nasty neighbour effect or no effect ==
A range of studies have found evidence of an effect opposite to the dear enemy effect, i.e. more aggression is shown toward neighbours than strangers. This has been termed the nasty neighbour effect.

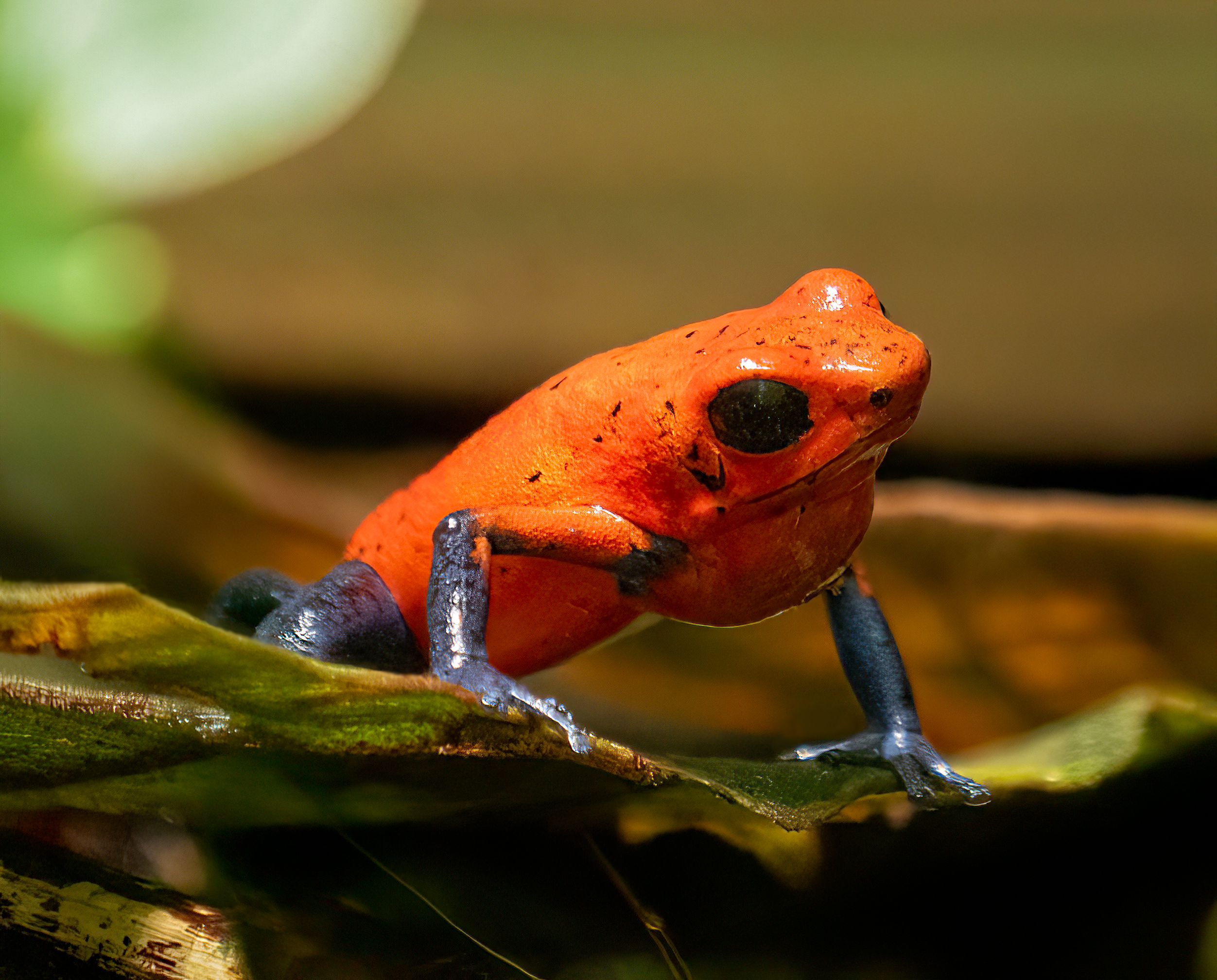
Strawberry poison-dart frog

Listen to the strawberry dart-poison frog
Male advertisement call

Colonies of the weaver ant (Oecophylla smaragdina) are able to recognize a greater proportion of workers from neighbouring colonies as non-colony members. When recognized as non-colony members, more aggression is exhibited toward neighbours than non-neighbours. Banded mongoose (Mungos mungo) groups vocalize more and inspect more scent samples in response to olfactory cues of neighbours than strangers. It has been suggested that increased aggression towards neighbours is more common in social species with intense competition between neighbours, as opposed to reduced aggression towards neighbours typical for most solitary species. Furthermore, animals may respond in this way when encounters with intruders from non-neighbouring colonies are rare and of little consequence.

Female New Zealand bellbirds (Anthornis melanura) are more aggressive toward the songs of neighbouring females. This is opposite to the dear enemy phenomenon and suggests that neighbouring females pose a greater threat than strangers in this species.

A range of studies have found no evidence of the dear enemy effect showing the effect is not universal. Territorial males of the strawberry poison-dart frog (Dendrobates pumilio) and the spotted antbird (Hylophylax naevioides) do not discriminate behaviourally between the calls of neighbours and strangers, and female collared lizards show no difference in their behaviour to neighbouring or unfamiliar females.

Guinea baboon (Papio papio) males which live in gangs do not differ in their response behaviour toward neighbouring and stranger males and largely ignore any non-gang member, irrespective of familiarity; that is, they neither show a "dear enemy" nor "nasty neighbour" effect.
