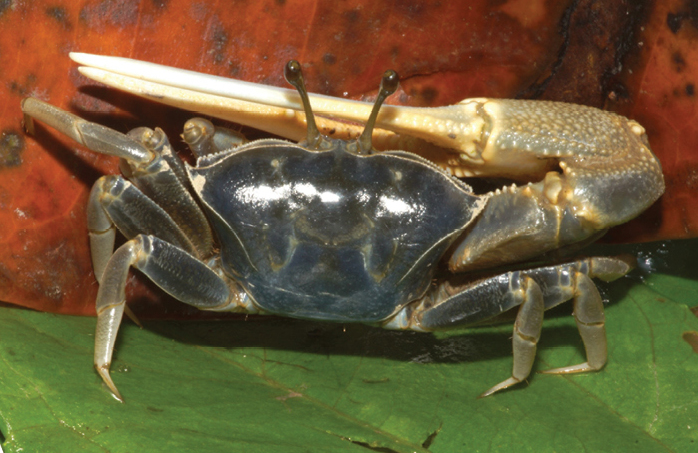
- Tubuca alcocki holotype, Thailand

Scientific classification
- Domain: Eukaryota
- Kingdom: Animalia
- Phylum: Arthropoda
- Class: Malacostraca
- Order: Decapoda
- Suborder: Pleocyemata
- Infraorder: Brachyura
- Family: Ocypodidae
- Subfamily: Gelasiminae
- Genus: Tubuca
- Species: T. alcocki

Binomial name
- Tubuca alcocki Shih, Chan & Ng, 2018

Synonyms
- Gelasimus acutus Alcock 1900; Gelasimus dussumieri A. Milne-Edwards 1868; Uca angustifrons Lundoer 1974; Uca (Deltuca) [coarctata] urvillei Crane 1975; Uca urvillei Frith et al. 1976; Uca (Deltuca) urvillei Hogarth 1986; Uca (Deltuca) dussumieri Krishnan 1992; Uca (Tubuca) urvillei Beinlich and von Hagen 2006; Uca (Tubuca) acuta Trivedi et al. 2015; Tubuca urvillei Shih et al. 2016

= Tubuca alcocki =

Species of crab

Tubuca alcocki is a species of fiddler crab. Its range includes most of the northern Indian Ocean, from western Thailand (facing the Andaman Sea), through the Bay of Bengal and India, to the Red Sea.

== Etymology ==
The specific name alcocki is in honor of Alfred William Alcock, the naturalist who recorded the species from India and Pakistan as Uca urvillei.

== Ecology ==
It is a mangrove species which lives sympatric with Austruca annulipes, Austruca bengali, Tubuca forcipata, Tubuca paradussumieri and Austruca iranica.
