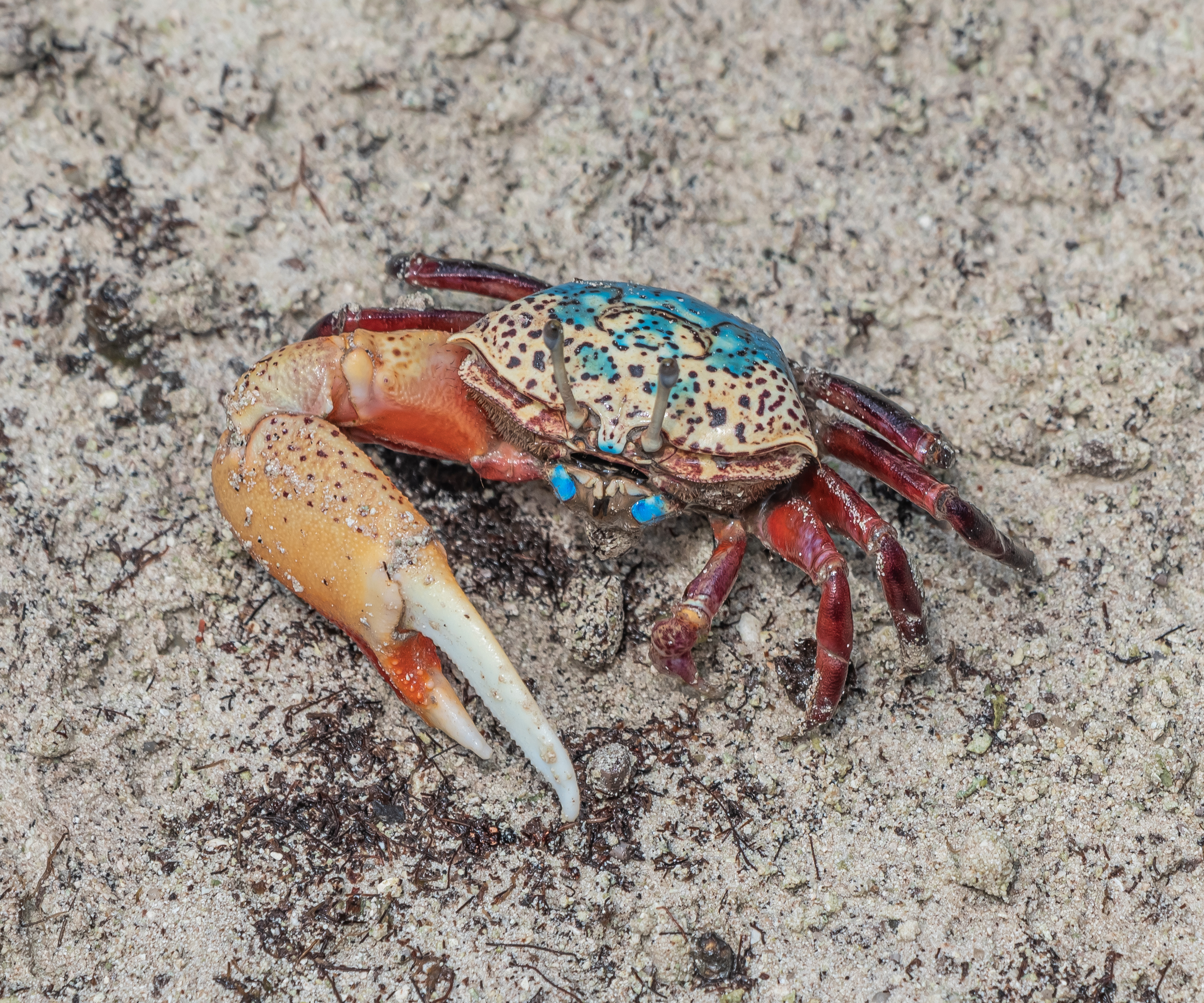

Scientific classification
- Kingdom: Animalia
- Phylum: Arthropoda
- Class: Malacostraca
- Order: Decapoda
- Suborder: Pleocyemata
- Infraorder: Brachyura
- Family: Ocypodidae
- Subfamily: Gelasiminae
- Tribe: Gelasimni
- Genus: Paraleptuca
- Species: P. chlorophthalmus

Binomial name
- Paraleptuca chlorophthalmus (H. Milne-Edwards, 1837)

Synonyms
- Gelasimus chlorophthalmus H. Milne Edwards, 1837; Uca amazonensis Doflein, 1899; Uca chlorophthalmus (H. Milne Edwards, 1837)

= Paraleptuca chlorophthalmus =

Species of crab

Paraleptuca chlorophthalmus, is a common fiddler crab found in the mangroves of East Africa, from Somalia to South Africa, as well as Madagascar and Mauritius. Marsh fiddlers dig burrows in the muddy or sandy banks of salt marshes, which they use to protect themselves from predators, high tide and extreme temperatures. They feed by filtering detritus out of mud, and defend their burrows against other fiddler crabs. Paraleptuca chlorophthalmus is characterised by its red pereiopods and blue and black markings on its carapace.

Paraleptuca chlorophthalmus was formerly a member of the genus Uca, but in 2016 it was placed in the genus Paraleptuca, a former subgenus of Uca.
