= Leptuca subcylindrica =

Scientific classification
- Domain: Eukaryota
- Kingdom: Animalia
- Phylum: Arthropoda
- Class: Malacostraca
- Order: Decapoda
- Suborder: Pleocyemata
- Infraorder: Brachyura
- Family: Ocypodidae
- Subfamily: Gelasiminae
- Tribe: Minucini
- Genus: Leptuca
- Species: L. subcylindrica

Binomial name
- Leptuca subcylindrica (Stimpson, 1859)

Synonyms
- List: Gelasimus subcylindricus Stimpson, 1859; Uca subcylindrica Rathbun, 1900

Species of crab

Leptuca subcylindrica, commonly known as the Laguna Madre fiddler crab or the puffed fiddler crab, is a sparsely-studied species of fiddler crab native to southern Texas and northeastern Mexico in the Gulf of Mexico.

Before 2016, the species was known as Uca subcylindrica. In 2016, the subgenus Leptuca was promoted to the genus level.

== Description ==
The carapace is tan to light orange in color and can be up to 25 mm wide. The species epithet is derived from its cylindrical carapace. The male lacks a tuberculate ridge on the palm of the major cheliped. Its gonopod is unlike other fiddlers crab in that the distal part of the inner process is divided and appears fringed.

== Habitat ==
The species lives in fresh to brackish water. Some habitats include mud flats, algal beds, rivers and creeks.
