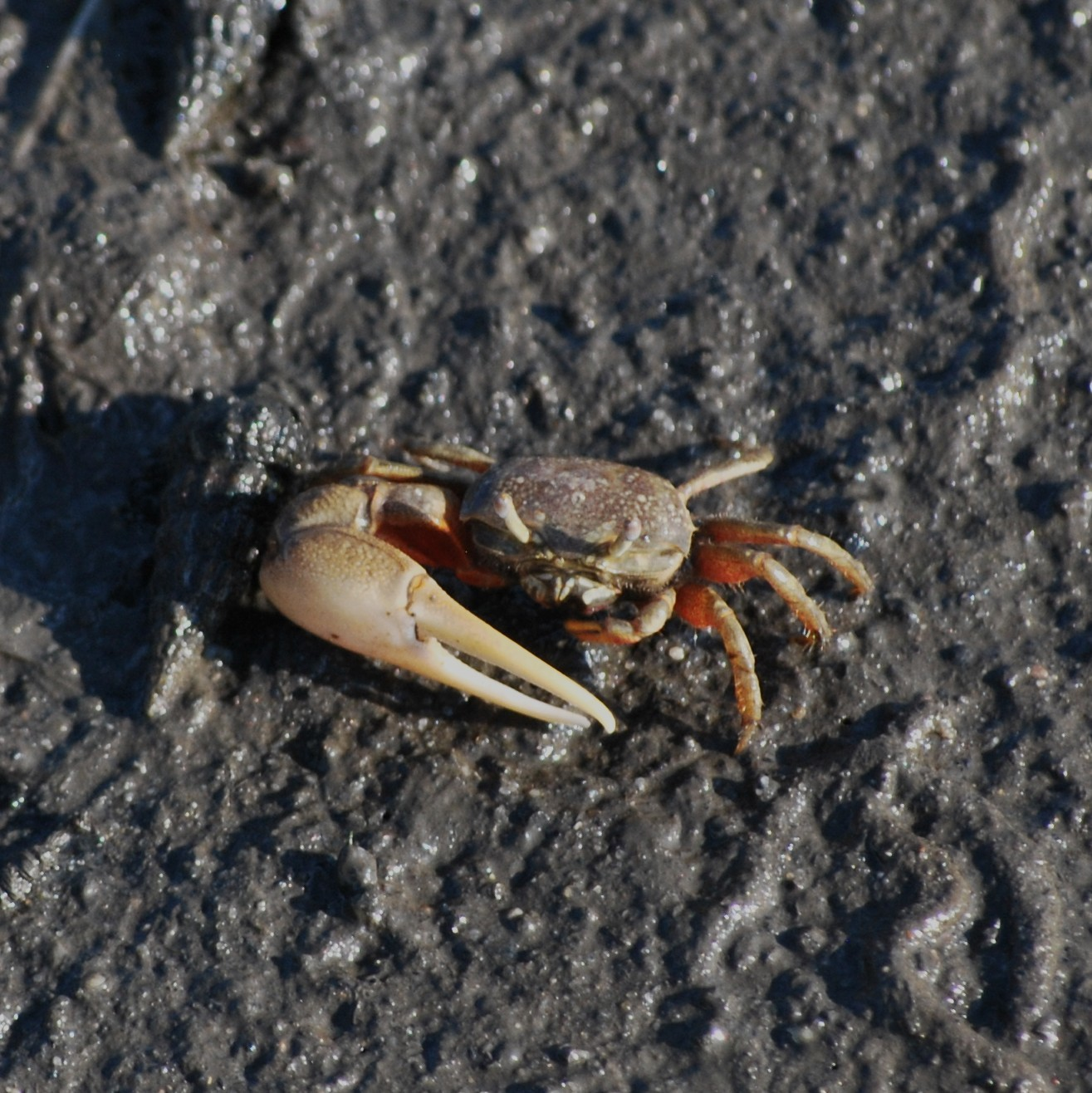

Scientific classification
- Domain: Eukaryota
- Kingdom: Animalia
- Phylum: Arthropoda
- Class: Malacostraca
- Order: Decapoda
- Suborder: Pleocyemata
- Infraorder: Brachyura
- Family: Ocypodidae
- Subfamily: Gelasiminae
- Genus: Leptuca
- Species: L. crenulata

Binomial name
- Leptuca crenulata (Lockington, 1877)

= Leptuca crenulata =

Mexican fiddler crab

Species of crab

Leptuca crenulata, commonly known as the Mexican fiddler crab, is a species of American broad-front fiddler crab in the family Ocypodidae.

Leptuca crenulata was formerly placed in the genus Uca, but in 2016 it was transferred to the genus Leptuca, a former subgenus of Uca.
