= Leptuca deichmanni =

Deichmann's fiddler crab

Scientific classification
- Kingdom: Animalia
- Phylum: Arthropoda
- Class: Malacostraca
- Order: Decapoda
- Suborder: Pleocyemata
- Infraorder: Brachyura
- Family: Ocypodidae
- Subfamily: Gelasiminae
- Tribe: Minucini
- Genus: Leptuca
- Species: L. deichmanni

Binomial name
- Leptuca deichmanni (Rathbun, 1935)

Synonyms
- Uca deichmanni (basionym)

Species of crab

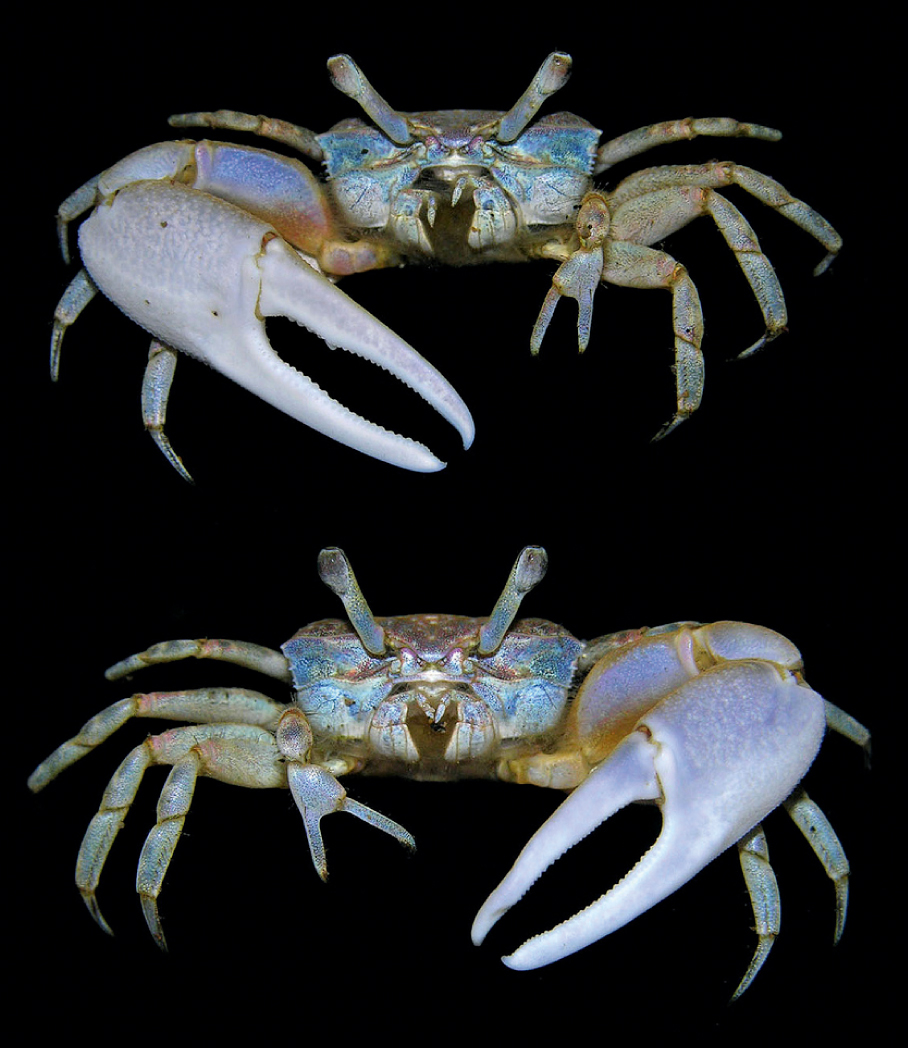
An example of a normal random asymmetry. Right-sided (upper) and left-sided (lower) individuals are equally common in males of the Uca deichmanni, from the Pacific coast of Central America.

Leptuca deichmanni, commonly known as Deichmann's fiddler crab, is a species of fiddler crab native to the eastern Pacific coast of Central America, in Costa Rica and Panama.

== Taxonomy ==
Previously a member of the genus Uca, the species was transferred in 2016 to the genus Leptuca when Leptuca was promoted from subgenus to genus level.

== Description ==
The crabs are normally 9.0–9.5 mm in carapace width. The carapace is strongly arched and is greenish brown to pale gray in color. The minor cheliped has a wide gape. Females have thin ambulatory legs.

== Habitat ==
The species prefers open, bay shores with either muddy sand substrate containing some small stones or pure sand substrate containing some large stones.
