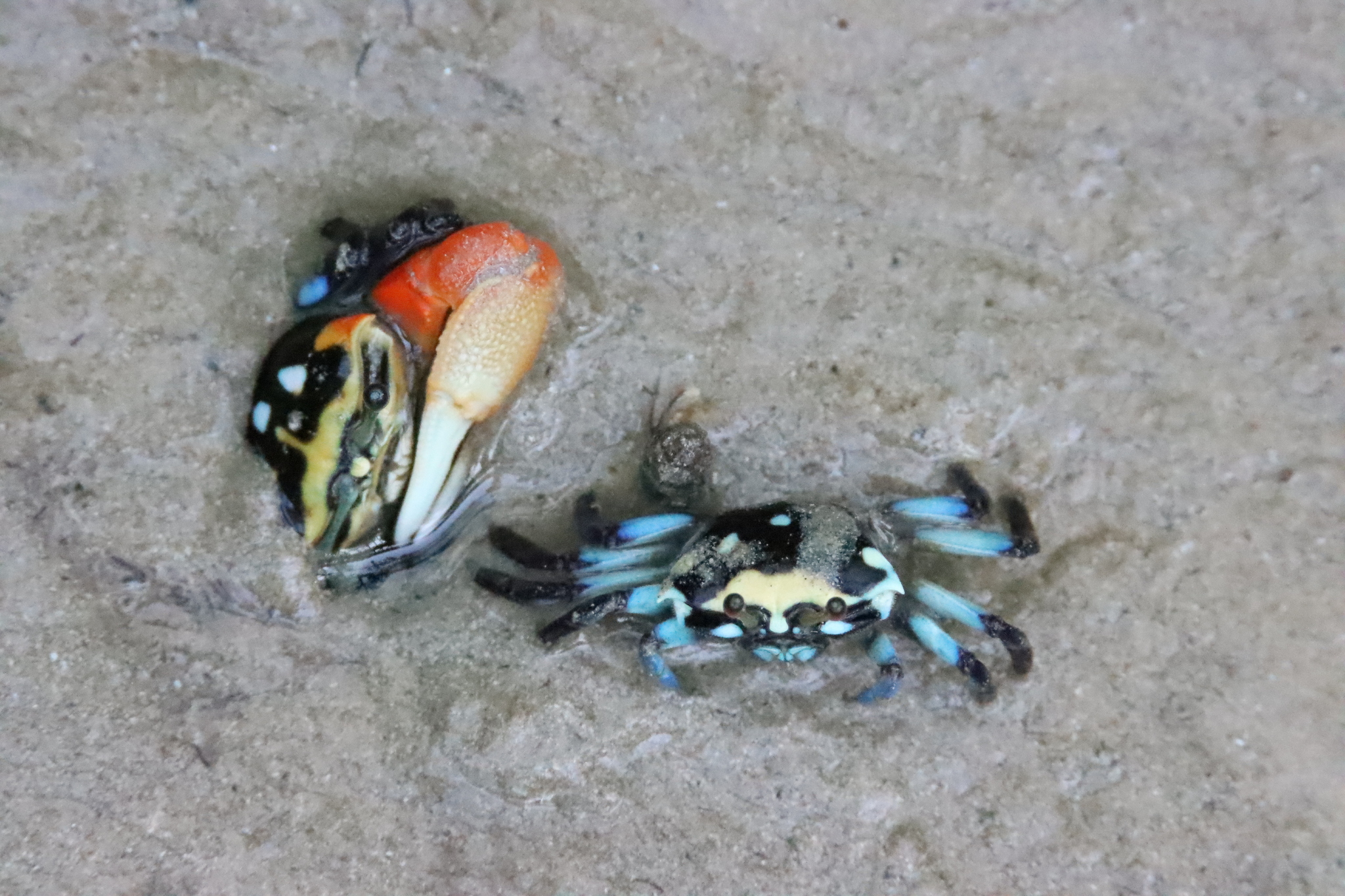

Scientific classification
- Kingdom: Animalia
- Phylum: Arthropoda
- Class: Malacostraca
- Order: Decapoda
- Suborder: Pleocyemata
- Infraorder: Brachyura
- Family: Ocypodidae
- Subfamily: Gelasiminae
- Genus: Tubuca
- Species: T. capricornis

Binomial name
- Tubuca capricornis (Crane, 1975)

= Tubuca capricornis =

Species of crabs

Tubuca capricornis, the capricorn fiddler crab, is a species of fiddler crab that is found in north west and northern Australia. It was named after its occurrence near the Tropic of Capricorn. These crabs live on shaded mud flats in mangroves.

== Description ==
The coloration is complex, changing considerably with moulting as the crabs grow. Rapid darkening can also occur when the crabs are stressed, for example when picked up, however underlying patterns remain. Colors are used to determine known neighbour crabs from unknown crabs.

Coloration is light blue for the smallest males and females, then changing as moulting occurs with growth to black and white. For males further changes with growth and moulting include a yellow 'scarf' area appearing behind the eyes, white spots appearing on the carapace and blue spots behind the fourth walking leg. Females change similarly to males with growth and moulting but develop more color variations including yellow or blue rather than white spots. For both sexes color variations reduce as the crabs grow further and the final adult stage is black with blue spots behind the fourth leg for males and similarly for females but for females spots can be extend further up the leg and be on multiple legs. The substantial color difference between adults and younger crabs initially caused the adults to be described as a separate species, Uca pavo, later corrected.

== Behavior ==
Some Tubuca capricornis crabs build mud chimneys, circular walls of mud around their burrow entrances, which have been shown to make their burrows harder to find for intruders. Juvenile and female crabs are more likely to build chimneys than male crabs. Chimneys are destroyed by incoming tide and are rebuilt when the tide recedes.

These crabs mate during spring tide on the surface at the entrance of the females burrow.
