= Leptuca cumulanta =

Scientific classification
- Domain: Eukaryota
- Kingdom: Animalia
- Phylum: Arthropoda
- Class: Malacostraca
- Order: Decapoda
- Suborder: Pleocyemata
- Infraorder: Brachyura
- Family: Ocypodidae
- Subfamily: Gelasiminae
- Tribe: Minucini
- Genus: Leptuca
- Species: L. cumulanta

Binomial name
- Leptuca cumulanta (Crane, 1943)

Synonyms
- Uca cumulanta Crane, 1943

Species of crab

Leptuca cumulanta, commonly known as the heaping fiddler crab or the mangrove fiddler crab, is a species of fiddler crab native to tropical and subtropical areas of the western Atlantic.

== Taxonomy ==
Previously a member of the genus Uca, the species was transferred in 2016 to the genus Leptuca when Leptuca was promoted from subgenus to genus level.

== Description ==
Carapace width is approximately 12–13 mm in adult males and 8–9 mm in adult females. Displaying males exhibit bright blue green carapaces.

== Distribution ==
The crab can be found in Central America (Panama), South America (Venezuela, Guyana, Suriname, and Brazil), and the Caribbean (Curaçao, Jamaica, and Trinidad). In Brazil, the crab can be found along the coast between the states of Para and Rio de Janeiro.

== Habitat ==
The species lives in brackish environments of low to moderate salinity, including mangrove stands and open mudflats. It lives on sandy silt and sandy clay substrate, and prefers substrate with at least some clay incorporated within it.
