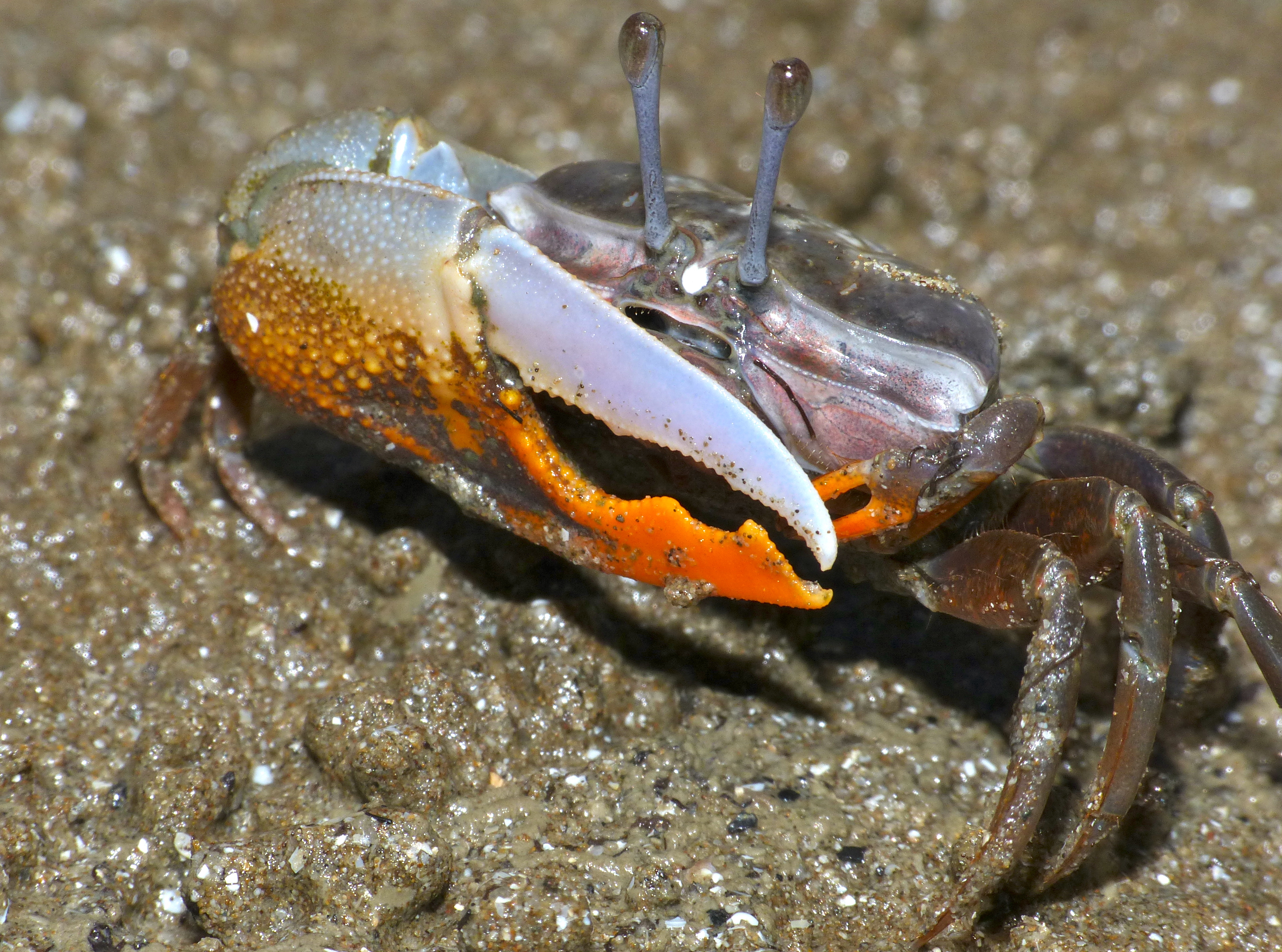
- male, Bako National Park, Malaysia

Scientific classification
- Kingdom: Animalia
- Phylum: Arthropoda
- Class: Malacostraca
- Order: Decapoda
- Suborder: Pleocyemata
- Infraorder: Brachyura
- Family: Ocypodidae
- Subfamily: Gelasiminae
- Tribe: Gelasimni
- Genus: Gelasimus
- Species: G. vocans

Binomial name
- Gelasimus vocans (Linnaeus, 1758)

Synonyms
- Cancer vocans Linnaeus, 1758; Gelasimus cultrimanus White, 1847; Gelasimus marionis Desmarest, 1823; Gelasimus nitidus Dana, 1851; Ocypode citharoedicus Say, 1817; Uca marionis forma excisa Nobili, 1906; Uca vocans (Linnaeus, 1758)

= Gelasimus vocans =

Species of fiddler crab

Gelasimus vocans is a species of fiddler crab. It is found across the Indo-Pacific from the Red Sea, Zanzibar and Madagascar to Indonesia and the central Pacific Ocean. It lives in burrows up to 50 centimetres (20 in) deep. Several forms of G. vocans have been recognised, with their authors often granting them the taxonomic rank of full species or subspecies.

Gelasimus vocans was formerly in the genus Uca, but in 2016 it was placed in the genus Gelasimus, a former subgenus of Uca.
