= Leptuca leptodactyla =

Scientific classification
- Domain: Eukaryota
- Kingdom: Animalia
- Phylum: Arthropoda
- Class: Malacostraca
- Order: Decapoda
- Suborder: Pleocyemata
- Infraorder: Brachyura
- Family: Ocypodidae
- Subfamily: Gelasiminae
- Tribe: Minucini
- Genus: Leptuca
- Species: L. leptodactyla

Binomial name
- Leptuca leptodactyla (Rathbun, 1898)

Synonyms
- Uca leptodactyla (basionym)

Species of crab

Leptuca leptodactyla, commonly known as the thin-fingered fiddler crab or the western Atlantic fiddler crab, is a species of fiddler crab native to the western Atlantic coast of the Americas.

== Taxonomy ==
Previously a member of the genus Uca, the species was transferred in 2016 to the genus Leptuca when Leptuca was promoted from subgenus to genus level.

== Description ==
The carapace can be up to 13mm wide.

== Distribution ==
The range of the crab includes southern Florida, Mexico, the West Indies, Venezuela, and Brazil. Within Brazil, the crab is present along the coast between the states of Maranhão and Santa Catarina.

== Habitat ==
The species lives in brackish and saline environments, including mangrove stands and intertidal sand flats. It prefers sandy substrate.
