= Leptuca beebei =

Scientific classification
- Domain: Eukaryota
- Kingdom: Animalia
- Phylum: Arthropoda
- Class: Malacostraca
- Order: Decapoda
- Suborder: Pleocyemata
- Infraorder: Brachyura
- Family: Ocypodidae
- Subfamily: Gelasiminae
- Tribe: Minucini
- Genus: Leptuca
- Species: L. beebei

Binomial name
- Leptuca beebei (Crane, 1941)

Synonyms
- Uca beebei (basionym)

Species of crab

Leptuca beebei, commonly known as Beebe's fiddler crab, is a species of fiddler crab native to the Pacific coasts of Central and South America, from El Salvador to northern Peru.

== Taxonomy ==
Previously a member of the genus Uca, the species was transferred in 2016 to the genus Leptuca when Leptuca was promoted from subgenus to genus level.

== Description ==
This is a small crab with an adult carapace width of approximately 10 millimetres (0.39 in).

== Habitat ==
The species can be found on open muddy sand flats in tropical regions.
