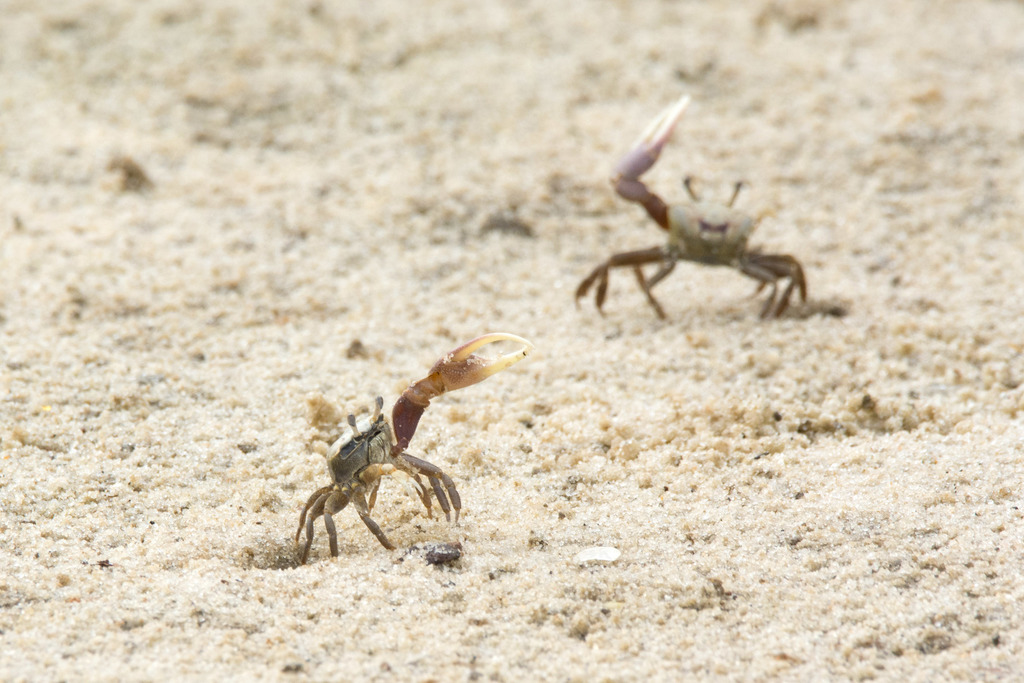
- Gulf sand fiddler crab

Scientific classification
- Domain: Eukaryota
- Kingdom: Animalia
- Phylum: Arthropoda
- Class: Malacostraca
- Order: Decapoda
- Suborder: Pleocyemata
- Infraorder: Brachyura
- Family: Ocypodidae
- Subfamily: Gelasiminae
- Tribe: Minucini
- Genus: Leptuca
- Species: L. panacea

Binomial name
- Leptuca panacea (Novak and Salmon, 1974)

= Leptuca panacea =

Species of crab

Leptuca panacea, commonly known as the Gulf sand fiddler crab or the Panacea sand fiddler, is a species of fiddler crab native to coastal habitats along the Gulf of Mexico from northwestern Florida to Mexico.

== Taxonomy ==
This species is the sister species of the Atlantic sand fiddler crab, L. pugilator. The ranges of the two species overlap in northwestern Florida, where they are known to hybridize.

Before 2016, the species was known as Uca panacea. In 2016, the subgenus Leptuca was promoted to the genus level.

== Description ==
The large claw of the male is smooth, lacking any tuberculate ridges. The inner margin of the carapace is bright orange to orangish-red.

== Habitat ==
The species lives in salt marshes or open sand flats on sand or sandy-mud substrata.
