= Leptuca speciosa =

Scientific classification
- Domain: Eukaryota
- Kingdom: Animalia
- Phylum: Arthropoda
- Class: Malacostraca
- Order: Decapoda
- Suborder: Pleocyemata
- Infraorder: Brachyura
- Family: Ocypodidae
- Subfamily: Gelasiminae
- Tribe: Minucini
- Genus: Leptuca
- Species: L. speciosa

Binomial name
- Leptuca speciosa (Ives, 1891)

Species of crab

Leptuca speciosa, commonly known as the brilliant fiddler crab or the longfinger fiddler crab, is a species of fiddler crab native to the southern United States, Mexico, and the Caribbean.

Before 2016, the species was known as Uca speciosa. In 2016, the subgenus Leptuca was promoted to the genus level.

== Description ==
The carapace can be up to 15mm wide. The large claw of the male is long and whitish, with the carpus lacking a distinct tubercle on the inner margin. Specimens from the Florida Keys are typically smaller than specimens from the northern Gulf.

== Distribution ==
In the United States, the crabs are present along the coast of Florida and on the outer islands of Alabama and Mississippi. The crabs are also present on the Yucatan Peninsula in Mexico, a few islands in the Bahamas, and the western tip of Cuba.

== Habitat ==
The species lives in brackish water on silt or silty sand substrata in intertidal marshes or mangrove thickets.

== Similar species ==
The range of the species rarely overlaps with the closely related L. spinicarpa, which frequents lower salinity habitat. Formerly, L. spinicarpa was described as a subspecies of L. speciosa.
