= Leptuca helleri =

Scientific classification
- Domain: Eukaryota
- Kingdom: Animalia
- Phylum: Arthropoda
- Class: Malacostraca
- Order: Decapoda
- Suborder: Pleocyemata
- Infraorder: Brachyura
- Family: Ocypodidae
- Subfamily: Gelasiminae
- Tribe: Minucini
- Genus: Leptuca
- Species: L. helleri

Binomial name
- Leptuca helleri (Rathbun, 1902)

Synonyms
- Uca helleri (basionym)

Species of crab

Leptuca helleri, commonly known as Heller's fiddler crab, is a species of fiddler crab endemic to the Galapagos Islands in the eastern Pacific Ocean.

== Taxonomy ==
Previously a member of the genus Uca, the species was transferred in 2016 to the genus Leptuca when Leptuca was promoted from subgenus to genus level.

== Description ==
The carapace can be up to 12 mm wide in the largest male individuals.
