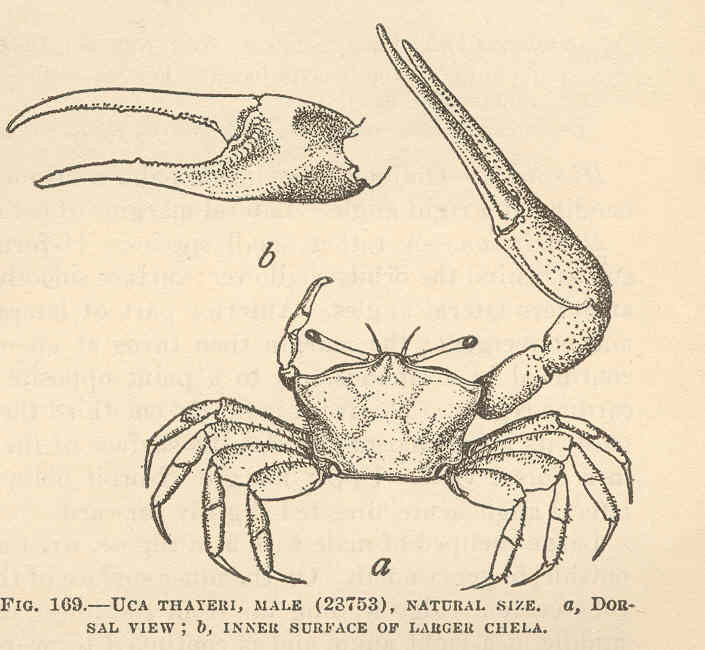

Scientific classification
- Kingdom: Animalia
- Phylum: Arthropoda
- Clade: Pancrustacea
- Class: Malacostraca
- Order: Decapoda
- Suborder: Pleocyemata
- Infraorder: Brachyura
- Family: Ocypodidae
- Subfamily: Gelasiminae
- Genus: Leptuca
- Species: L. thayeri

Binomial name
- Leptuca thayeri M. J. Rathbun, 1900

= Leptuca thayeri =

Species of crustacean

Leptuca thayeri, known generally as the Atlantic mangrove fiddler crab or mangrove fiddler, is a species of true crab in the family Ocypodidae. It is distributed all across the Western Atlantic.

Leptuca thayeri was formerly a member of the genus Uca, but in 2016 it was placed in the genus Leptuca, a former subgenus of Uca.

== Ecology ==
Living on and within the sediments of mangrove trees, this fiddler crab has an ecological importance. The fiddler crab influences the structure and biology of the sediment through foraging and by constructing burrows for defense.

The fiddler crab, Leptuca thayeri, influence bacterial assemblages in the sediment surrounding the mangrove trees they inhabit by decreasing bacterial diversity through foraging. While foraging, these fiddler crabs divide out the individual sediment grains with their spoon-tipped setae. This division of sediment grain allows for the bioturbation of sediments which allows oxygen penetration at depth and remineralization of organic matter.

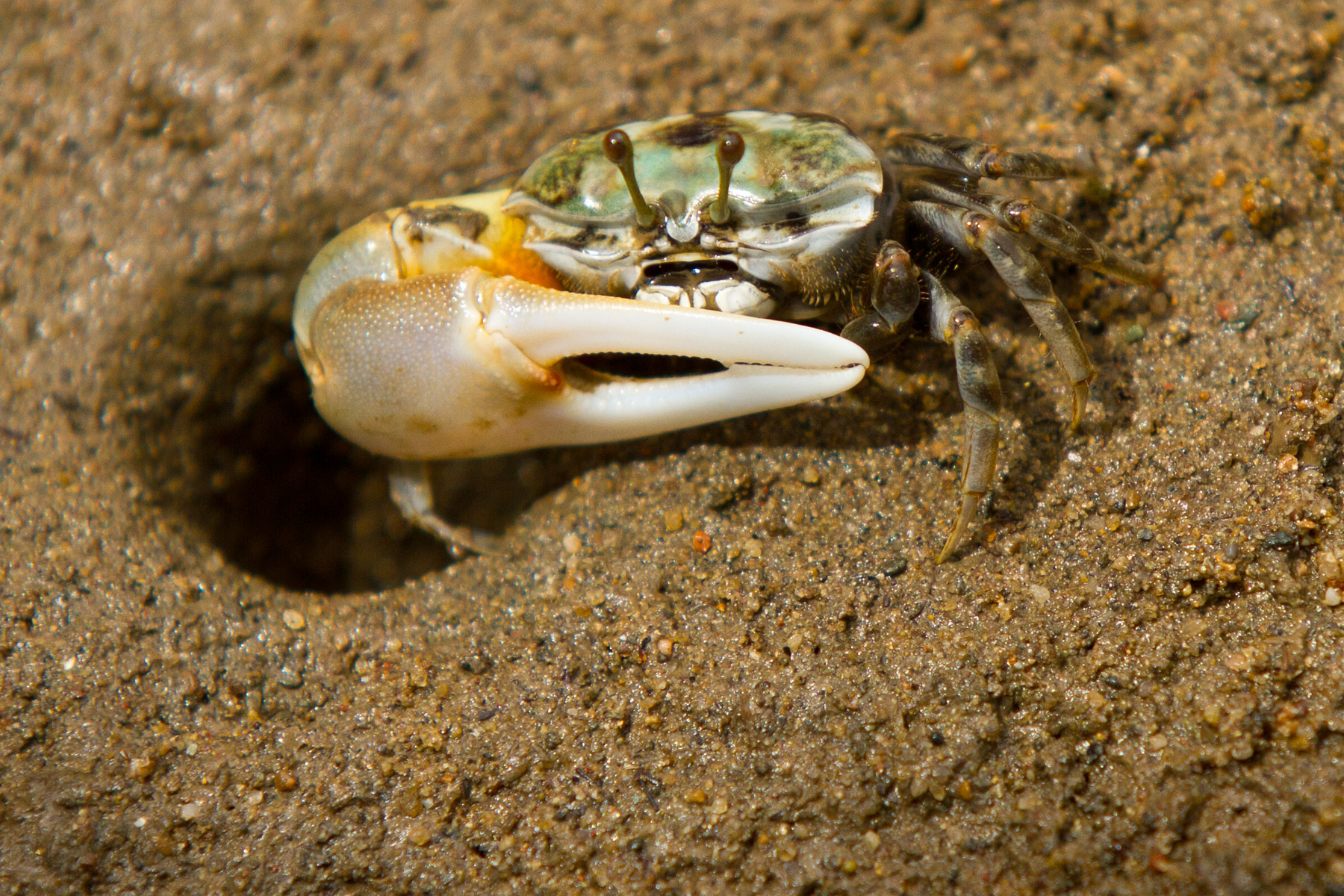
Fiddler Gelasimus vomeris, a related member to the Leptuca thayeri.

== Reproductive behaviors ==
Perhaps the most widely studied aspect of the mangrove fiddler crab is its unique reproductive behavior. When studied broadly, the U. thayeri resembles a "broad front" fiddler crab, which describes the spacing of the eye stalks. This appearance, usually indicates that the individual crab would have resource-based mating system, while in fact, the mangrove fiddler crab exhibits the opposite, which is a resource-free mating system. This switch in behavior has been best described as an evolutionary convergence of reproductive behaviors between the "broad" and "narrow" front crabs.

Another aspect to the reproductive behavior of U. thayeri is the hatching time of larval crabs in relation to the tide. In this species, it has been determined, regardless of whether the tides are semi-diurnal or mixed, larval crabs will be released after high tide, when the light-dark cycle and tidal amplitude are most favorable for high survivorship of the larvae.

Size matters with this species. In a study by Bezzarra and authors, the relationship between size of the crab carapace and fecundity, amount of offspring produced at a potential mating season. This relationship that was analyzed, was that there was a positive correlation, meaning that the larger the carapace, the more offspring that the female fiddlers would be able to have. This idea also relates with sexual maturity. In the mangrove fiddler crab, to determine sexual maturity in both the male and female crabs, the size of the male cheliped and the female abdomen controls it.

== Distribution ==
Globally, Leptuca thayeri, is distributed in the Western Atlantic around the subtropical mangroves in Ubatuba, State of São Paulo, and Brazil.

Within the mangrove trees themselves, Leptuca thayeri is euryhaline and is able to survive in a salinity from 4 to 32. This mangrove fiddler crab is also reliant on the substrate quality, such as: pebble/sand/silt/clay balance, organic matter availability, and the abundance of seagrass.

Another factor that the mangrove fiddlers are dependent on in their distribution is temperature. During the warmer months of the year, the population is more pronounced and more widely distributed compared to the colder months of fall and winter.

== Visual system ==
In the eyes of mangrove fiddlers, exist a simple system used to detect light and even decipher between different colors. The existence of two visual pigments, one that has a peak absorption at 430 nm and the second between 500 - 540 nm, is the source of their visual prowess.
