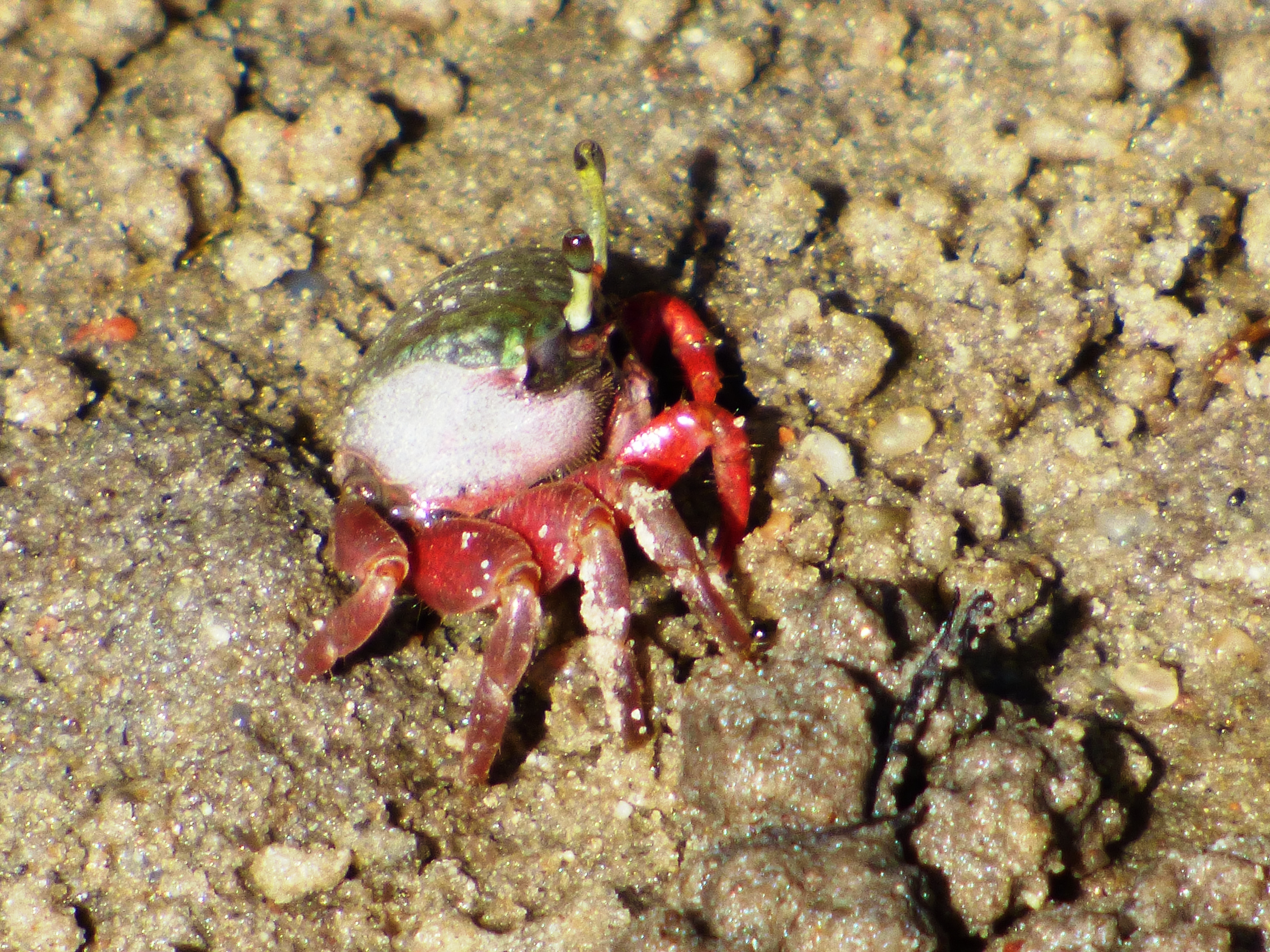
- L. uruguayensis

Scientific classification
- Domain: Eukaryota
- Kingdom: Animalia
- Phylum: Arthropoda
- Class: Malacostraca
- Order: Decapoda
- Suborder: Pleocyemata
- Infraorder: Brachyura
- Family: Ocypodidae
- Subfamily: Gelasiminae
- Tribe: Minucini
- Genus: Leptuca
- Species: L. uruguayensis

Binomial name
- Leptuca uruguayensis (Nobili, 1901)

Synonyms
- Uca uruguayensis Nobil, 1901

= Leptuca uruguayensis =

Species of crab

Leptuca uruguayensis, commonly known as the Uruguayan fiddler crab or the southwestern Atlantic fiddler crab, is a species of fiddler crab native to temperate and subtropical areas of the southeastern coast of South America.

== Taxonomy ==
Previously a member of the genus Uca, the species was transferred in 2016 to the genus Leptuca when Leptuca was promoted from subgenus to genus level.

== Description ==
The adult crab's carapace is usually between 10 and 16.5 millimetres (0.39 and 0.65 in) wide. Non-breeding males have a green carapace and red major cheliped; when breeding, the carapace of the male whitens. The major cheliped can remain red or also whiten.

== Distribution ==
The crab is native to South America where its range includes Brazil, Uruguay, and Argentina.

== Habitat ==
The species lives on silty sand or sandy silt soils with some organic matter. It prefers brackish and saline environments of moderate to high salinity.
