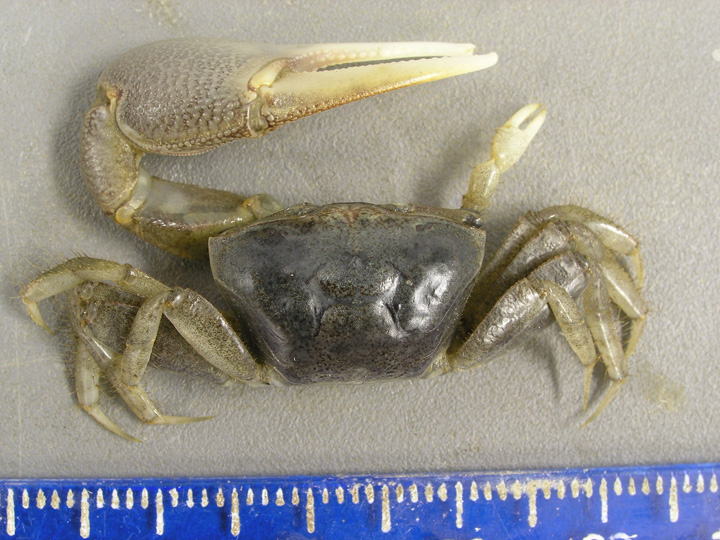

Scientific classification
- Kingdom: Animalia
- Phylum: Arthropoda
- Class: Malacostraca
- Order: Decapoda
- Suborder: Pleocyemata
- Infraorder: Brachyura
- Family: Ocypodidae
- Subfamily: Gelasiminae
- Tribe: Minucini
- Genus: Leptuca
- Species: L. spinicarpa

Binomial name
- Leptuca spinicarpa (Rathbun, 1900)

Synonyms
- Uca spinicarpa (basionym)

= Leptuca spinicarpa =

Species of crab

Leptuca spinicarpa, commonly known as the spiny-wristed fiddler crab or the spined fiddler crab, is a species of fiddler crab native to coastal habitats along the Gulf of Mexico from northwestern Florida to Mexico.

== Taxonomy ==
Previously a member of the genus Uca, the species was transferred in 2016 to the genus Leptuca when Leptuca was promoted from subgenus to genus level.

At one time, L. spinicarpa was reduced to a subspecies of L. speciosa, but this is no longer accepted due to morphological, genetic, and behavioral differences.

== Description ==
The carapace can be up to 23mm wide and is often green in color in the frontal area. Strongly raised tuberculate ridges are present on the palm of the male's major cheliped; a large tubercle is present on the carpus.

== Habitat ==
The species lives in fresh to brackish water on intertidal banks and marshes with firm clay, clay-sand, or clay-mud substratum.
