= Leptuca saltitanta =

Scientific classification
- Domain: Eukaryota
- Kingdom: Animalia
- Phylum: Arthropoda
- Class: Malacostraca
- Order: Decapoda
- Suborder: Pleocyemata
- Infraorder: Brachyura
- Family: Ocypodidae
- Subfamily: Gelasiminae
- Tribe: Minucini
- Genus: Leptuca
- Species: L. saltitanta

Binomial name
- Leptuca saltitanta (Crane, 1941)

Synonyms
- List: Uca saltitanta Crane, 1941; Uca saltitanta saltitanta Bott, 1954

Species of crab

Leptuca saltitanta, commonly known as the energetic fiddler crab, is a species of fiddler crab native to the eastern Pacific coasts, from El Salvador in Central America to Colombia in South America.

== Taxonomy ==
Previously a member of the genus Uca, the species was transferred in 2016 to the genus Leptuca when Leptuca was promoted from subgenus to genus level.

== Description ==
This is a small crab with an adult carapace width of approximately 6–9 mm. Females are dark, whereas non-displaying males can be gray, yellow, or brown. Displaying males are usually entirely white, but some coloring may be present.

== Habitat ==
The species prefers to live in unshaded, open mudflats near river mouths. Mangrove stands are usually nearby.
