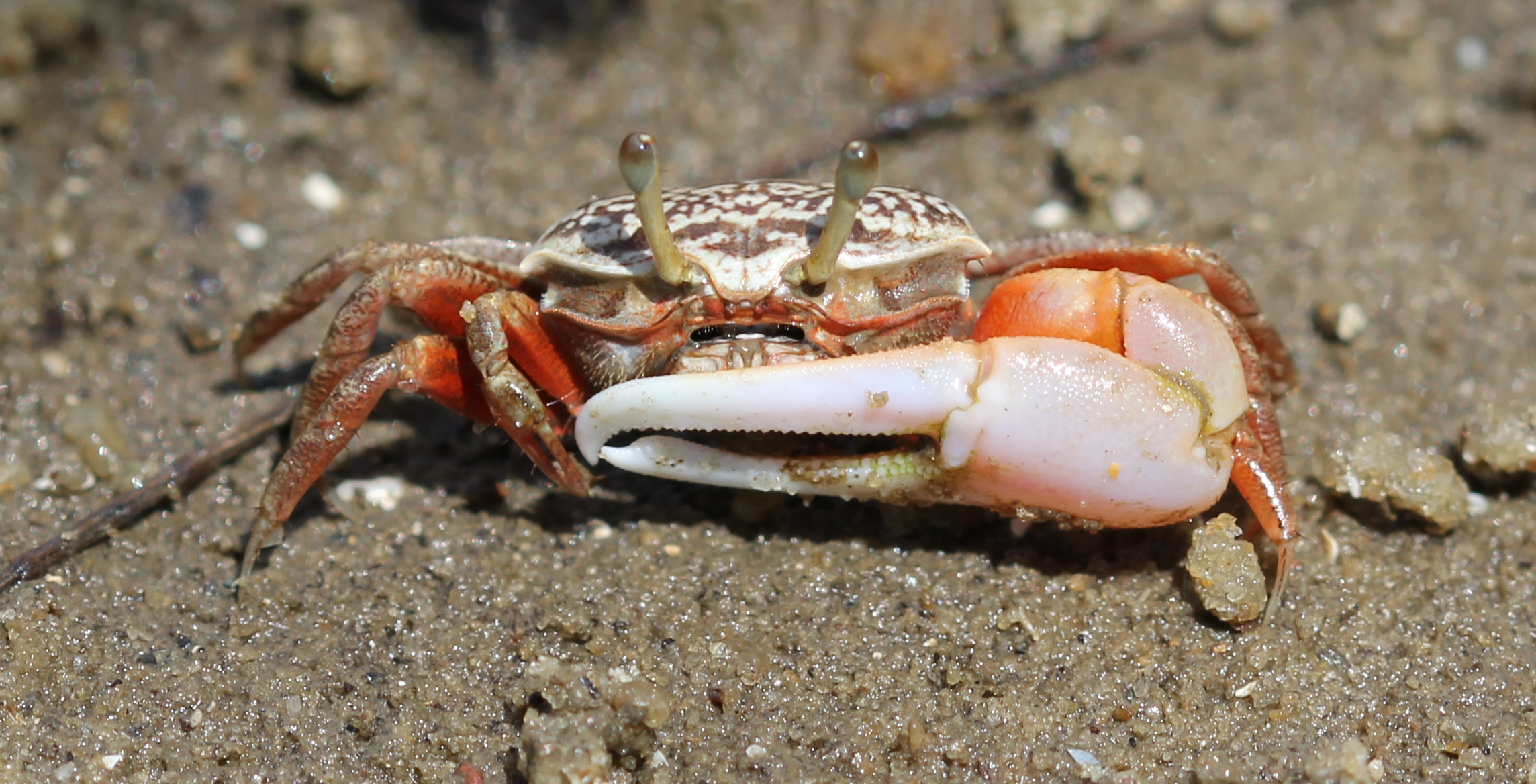
- male
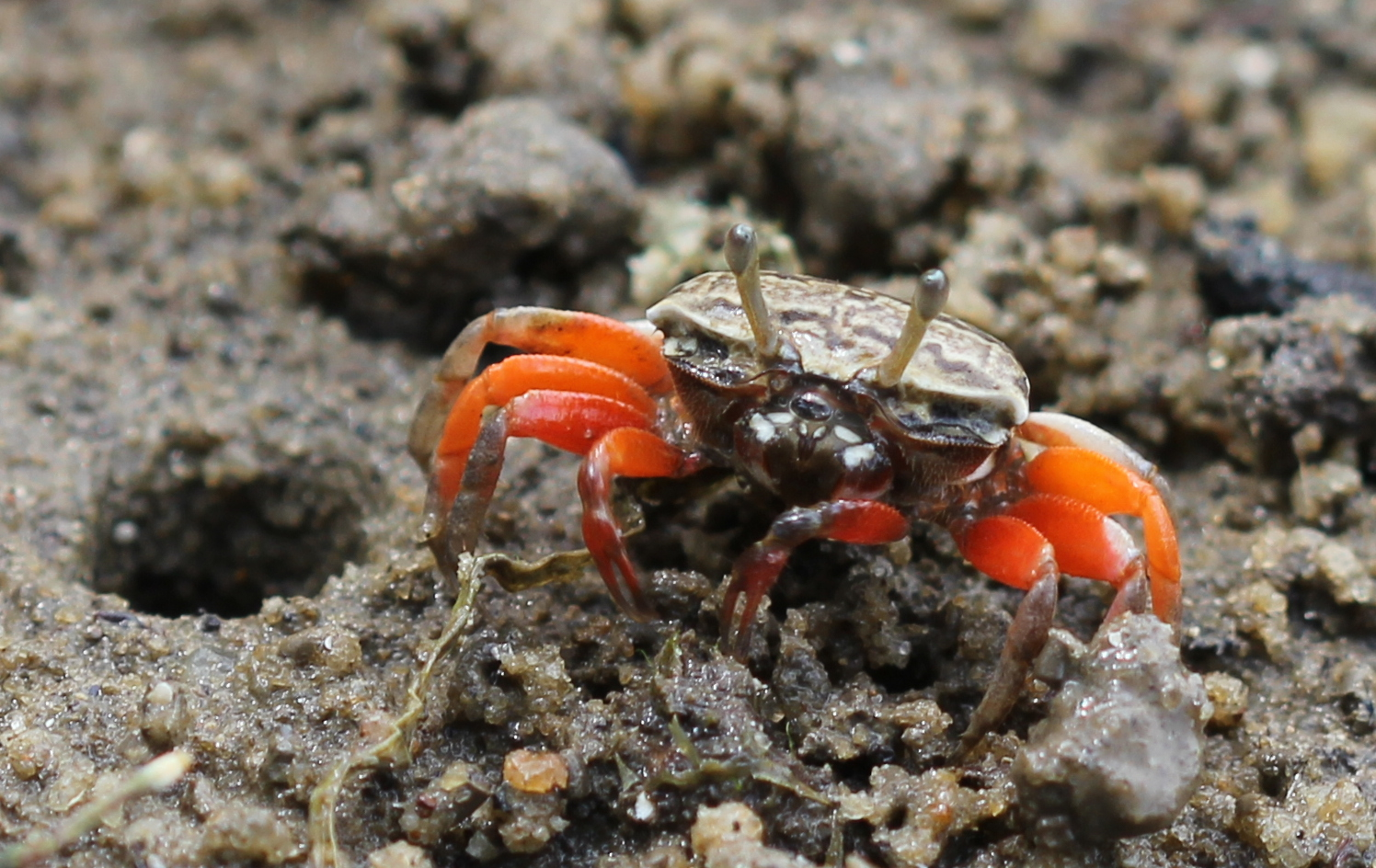
- female

Scientific classification
- Kingdom: Animalia
- Phylum: Arthropoda
- Clade: Pancrustacea
- Class: Malacostraca
- Order: Decapoda
- Suborder: Pleocyemata
- Infraorder: Brachyura
- Family: Ocypodidae
- Subfamily: Gelasiminae
- Tribe: Gelasimni
- Genus: Austruca
- Species: A. annulipes

Binomial name
- Austruca annulipes (H. Milne-Edwards, 1837)

Synonyms
- Gelasimus annulipes H. Milne-Edwards, 1837; Uca annulipes (H. Milne-Edwards, 1837)

= Austruca annulipes =

Species of crab

Austruca annulipes is a species of fiddler crab found along the coastline from South Africa to Somalia, Madagascar, India, China, Indonesia, Malaysia, and the Philippines.

Austruca annulipes was formerly in the genus Uca, but in 2016 it became a member of the genus Leptuca, a former subgenus of Uca.

They are relatively small crabs, and can be seen feeding in the evening at low tide. The males and females differ in size and appearance: the larger males are endowed with a brightly colored front claw. Compared to the females (and even the smaller male Uca annulipes crabs), the male Austruca annulipes crabs spend the most time excavating their burrows. House crows are known to prey upon these crabs, which are quick to hide in their burrows at the slightest hint of danger.

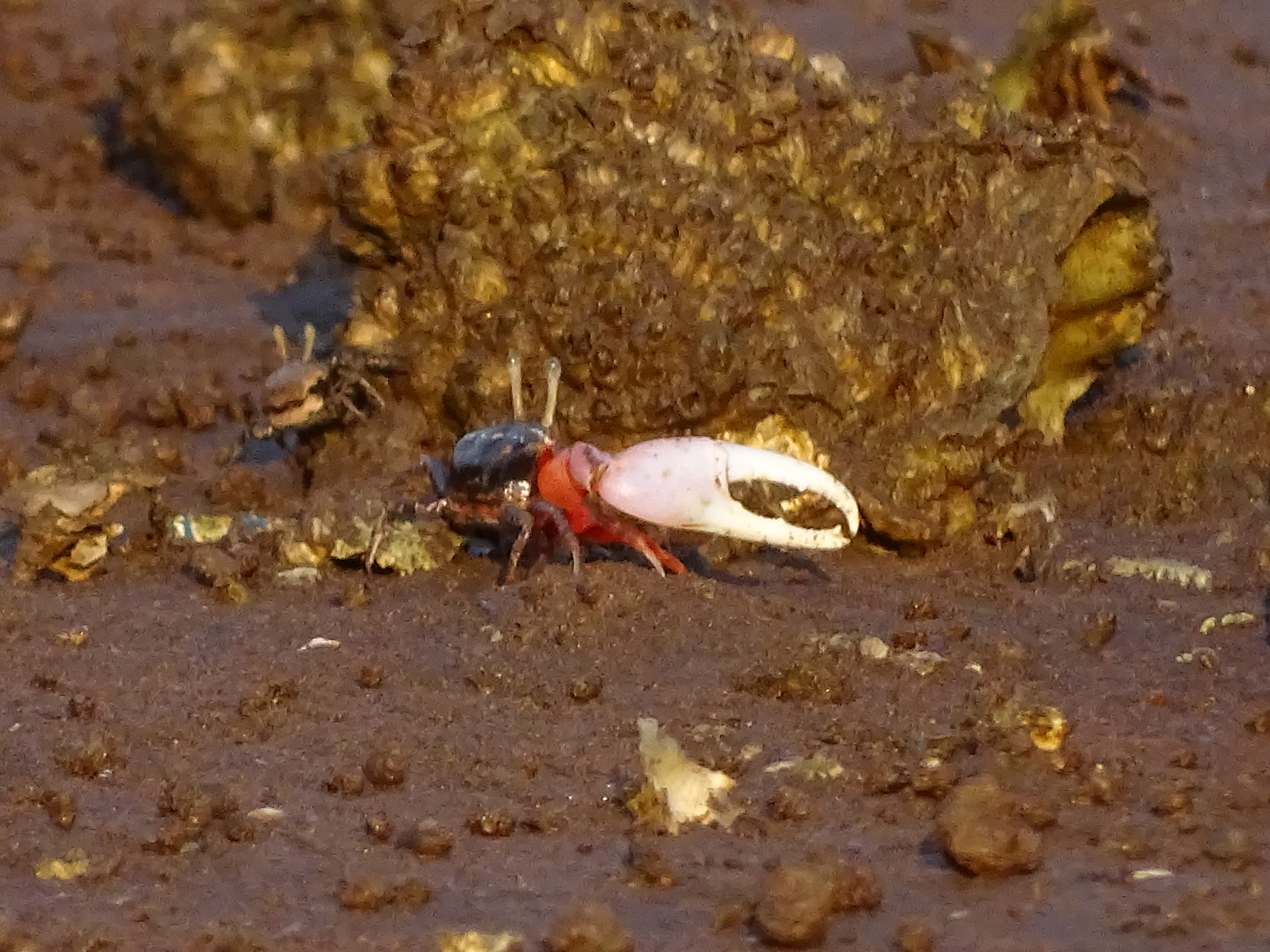

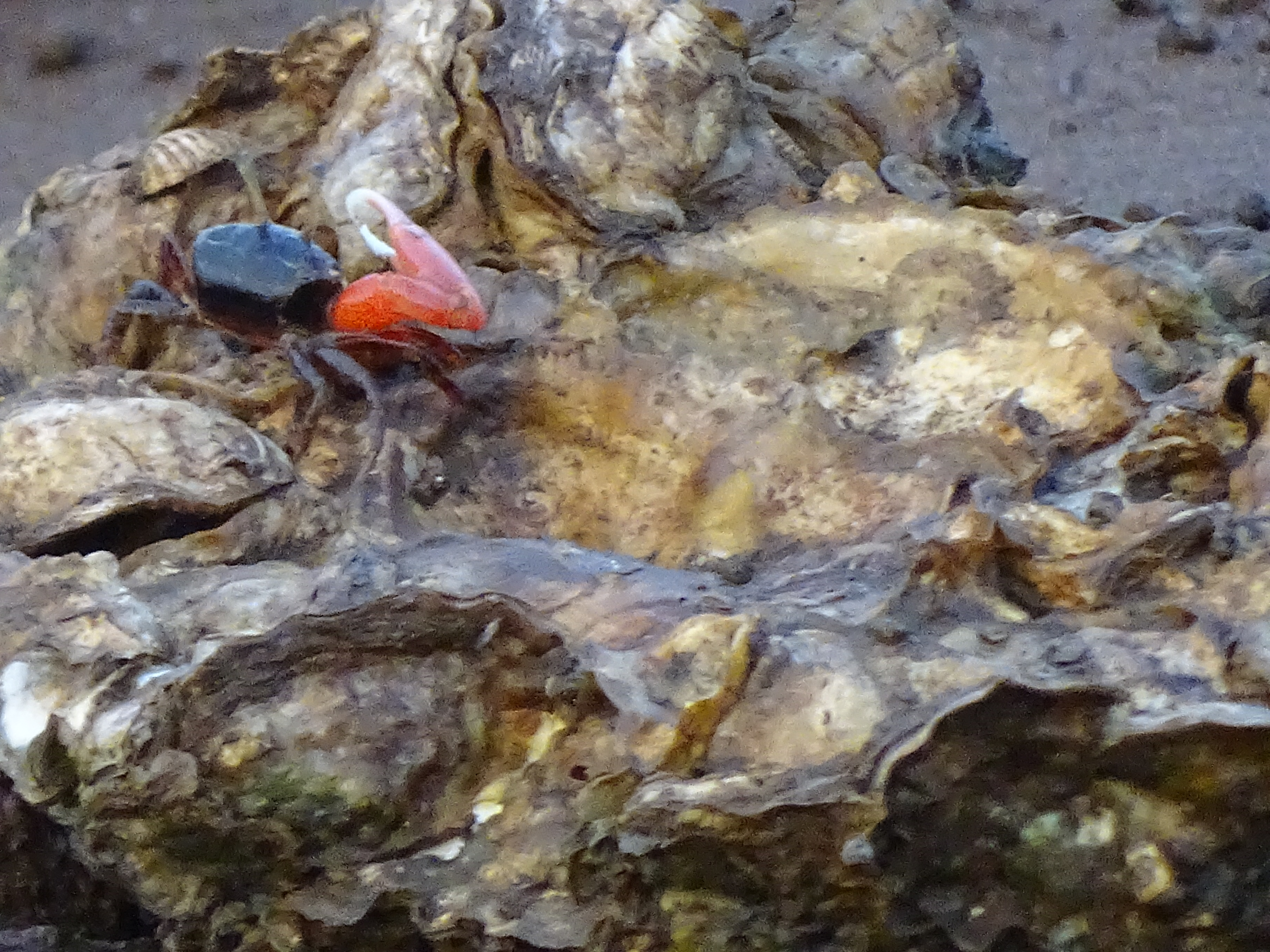

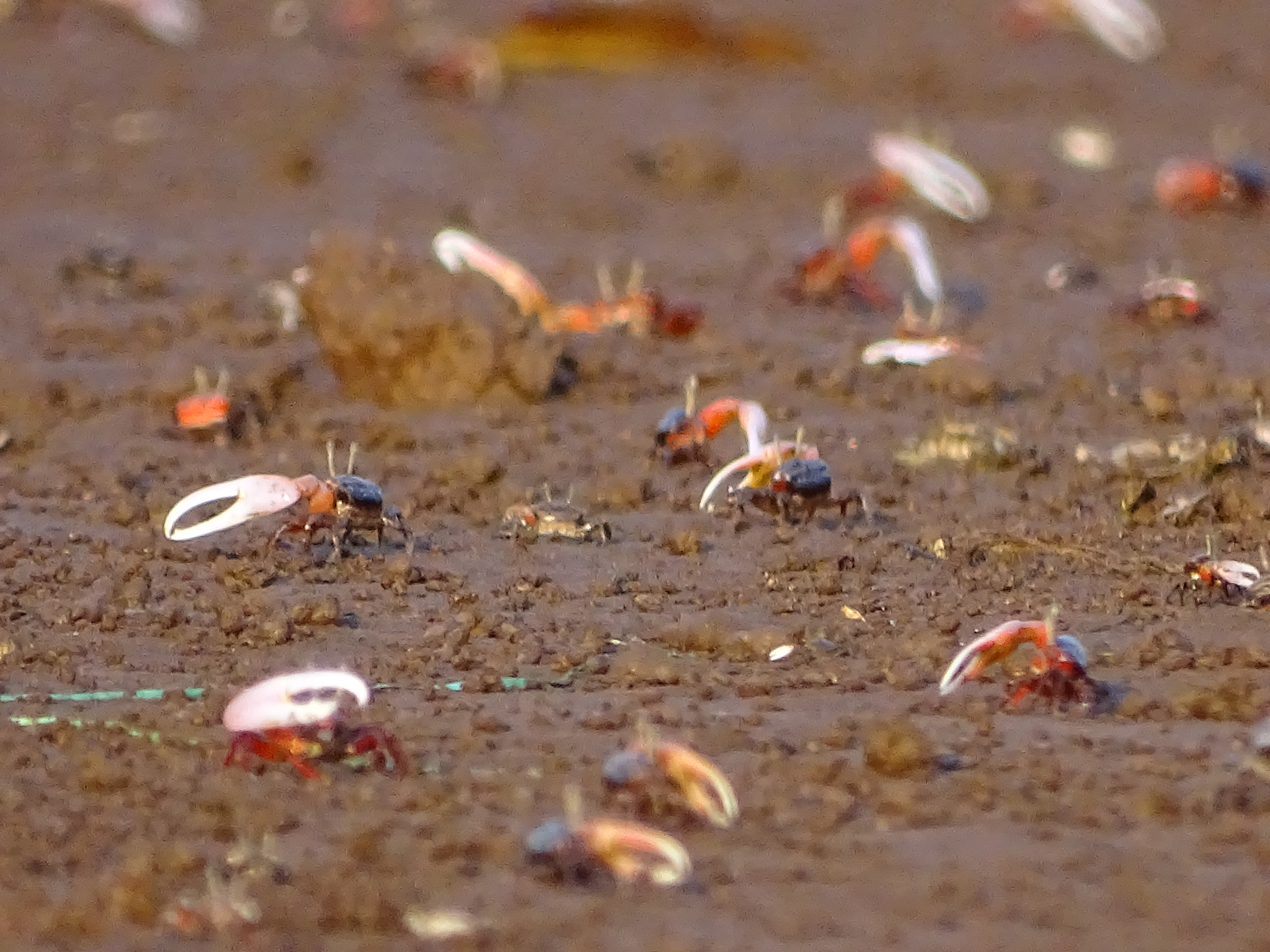
