= Leptuca batuenta =

Scientific classification
- Domain: Eukaryota
- Kingdom: Animalia
- Phylum: Arthropoda
- Class: Malacostraca
- Order: Decapoda
- Suborder: Pleocyemata
- Infraorder: Brachyura
- Family: Ocypodidae
- Subfamily: Gelasiminae
- Tribe: Minucini
- Genus: Leptuca
- Species: L. batuenta

Binomial name
- Leptuca batuenta (Crane, 1941)

Synonyms
- List: Uca batuenta Crane, 1941; Uca saltitanta batuenta Bott, 1954

Species of crab

Leptuca batuenta, commonly known as the beating fiddler crab, is a species of fiddler crab native to the tropical eastern Pacific, from El Salvador to northern Peru.

== Taxonomy ==
Previously a member of the genus Uca, the species was transferred in 2016 to the genus Leptuca when Leptuca was promoted from subgenus to genus level.

== Description ==
This crab is very small; carapace width is approximately 7 millimetres (0.28 in) in adult males and 5 millimetres (0.20 in) in adult females. Both sexes have a pale brown to yellow carapace with some white marbling. Individuals may have green eyestalks.

== Habitat ==
The species can be found on open mudflats and among unshaded mangrove roots. It prefers mud substrate.
