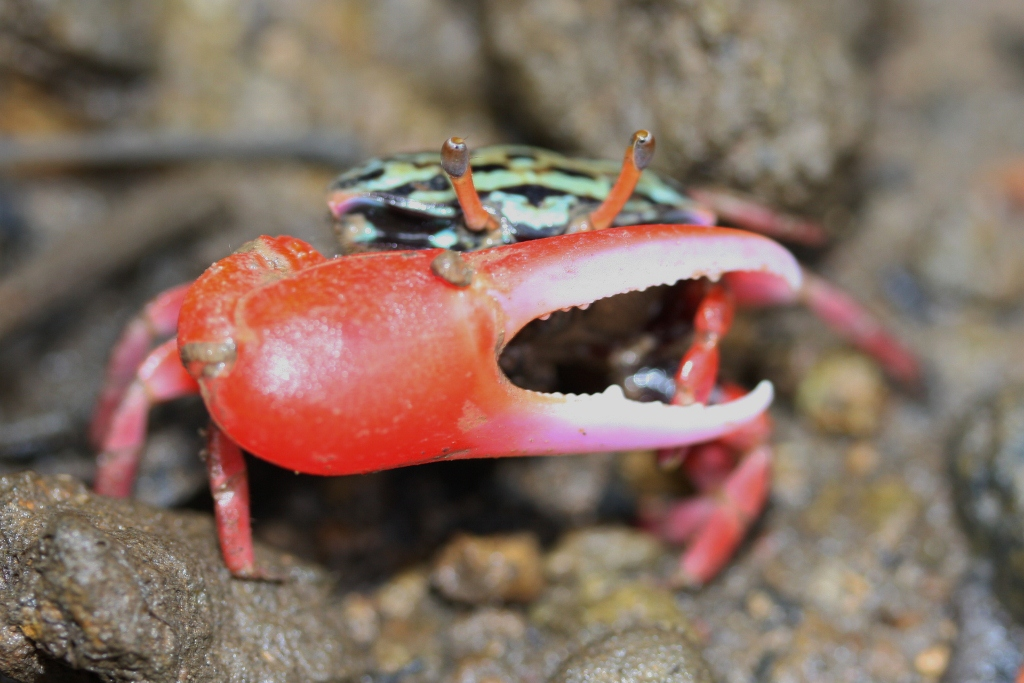

Scientific classification
- Kingdom: Animalia
- Phylum: Arthropoda
- Class: Malacostraca
- Order: Decapoda
- Suborder: Pleocyemata
- Infraorder: Brachyura
- Family: Ocypodidae
- Subfamily: Gelasiminae
- Genus: Paraleptuca
- Species: P. crassipes

Binomial name
- Paraleptuca crassipes (White, 1847)

Synonyms
- Gelasimus crassipes White, 1847

= Paraleptuca crassipes =

Thick-legged fiddler crab

Species of crab

Paraleptuca crassipes or the thick-legged fiddler crab is a species of fiddler crab that lives in intertidal habitats distributed across the western Pacific Ocean.

Paraleptuca crassipes was formerly a member of the genus Uca, but in 2016 it was placed in the genus Paraleptuca, a former subgenus of Uca.

== Distribution ==
Paraleptuca crassipes has a natural range that extends from New Caledonia, to eastern Australian shores, the island of New Guinea, the Philippines, China and the southernmost islands of Japan. They are a species which prefers mangrove habitats.

== Description ==
Paraleptuca crassipes usually have a crimson red carapace although some individuals may have black margins or patches. The large male cheliped is reddish pink. Walking legs can be crimson red or black. Bright sky blue patches may be present on the face and around the bases of the walking legs.
