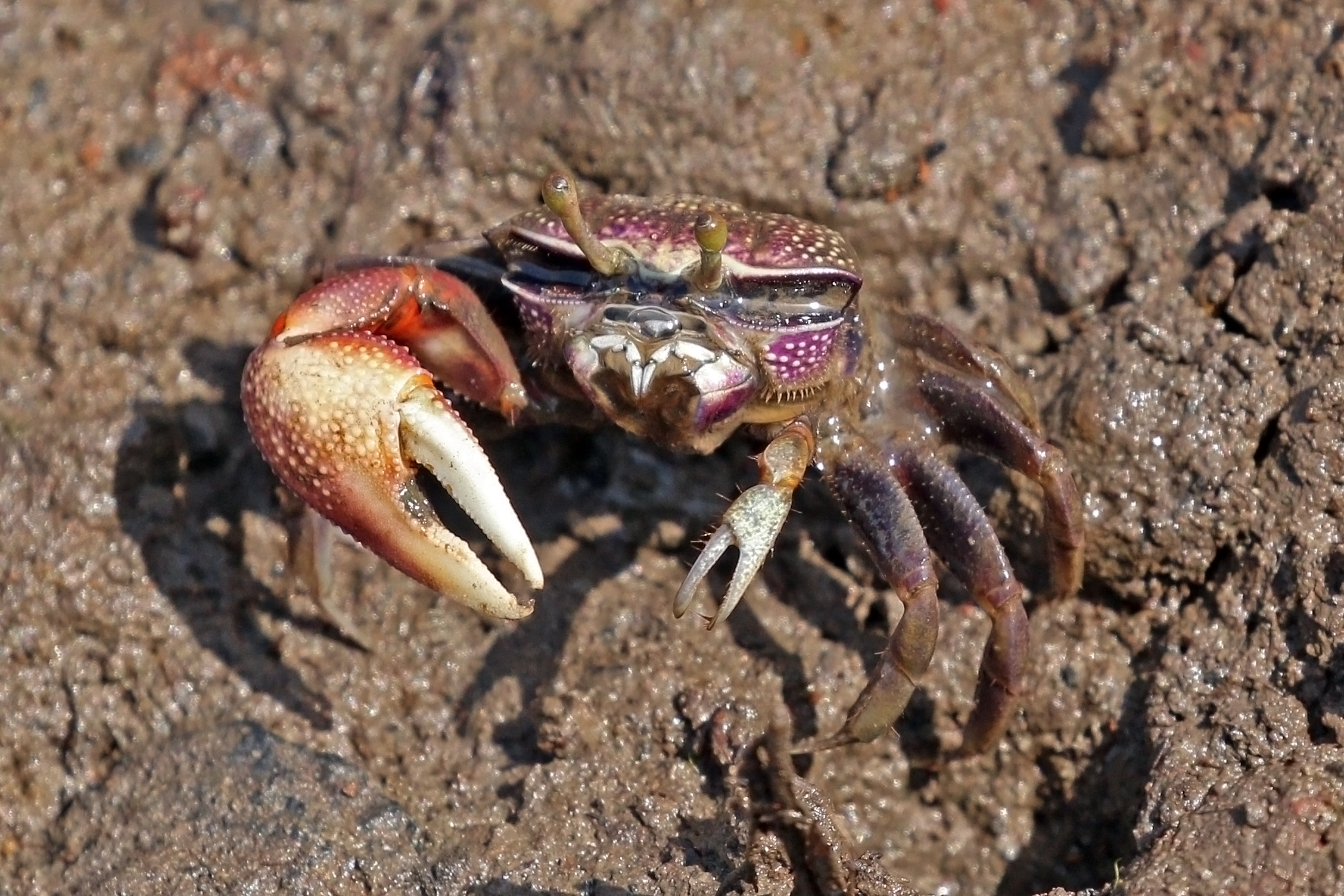
- male, Gambia

Scientific classification
- Kingdom: Animalia
- Phylum: Arthropoda
- Clade: Pancrustacea
- Class: Malacostraca
- Order: Decapoda
- Suborder: Pleocyemata
- Infraorder: Brachyura
- Family: Ocypodidae
- Genus: Afruca; Crane, 1975
- Species: A. tangeri

Binomial name
- Afruca tangeri (Eydoux, 1835)

Synonyms
- Uca tangeri; Gelasimus cimatodus Rochebrune, 1833; Gelasimus tangeri Eydoux, 1835; Gelasimus platydactylus H. Milne-Edwards, 1837; Gelasimus perlatus Herklots, 1851; Gonoplax speciosus Monod, 1933 [nomen nudum]

= Afruca =

Genus of crab

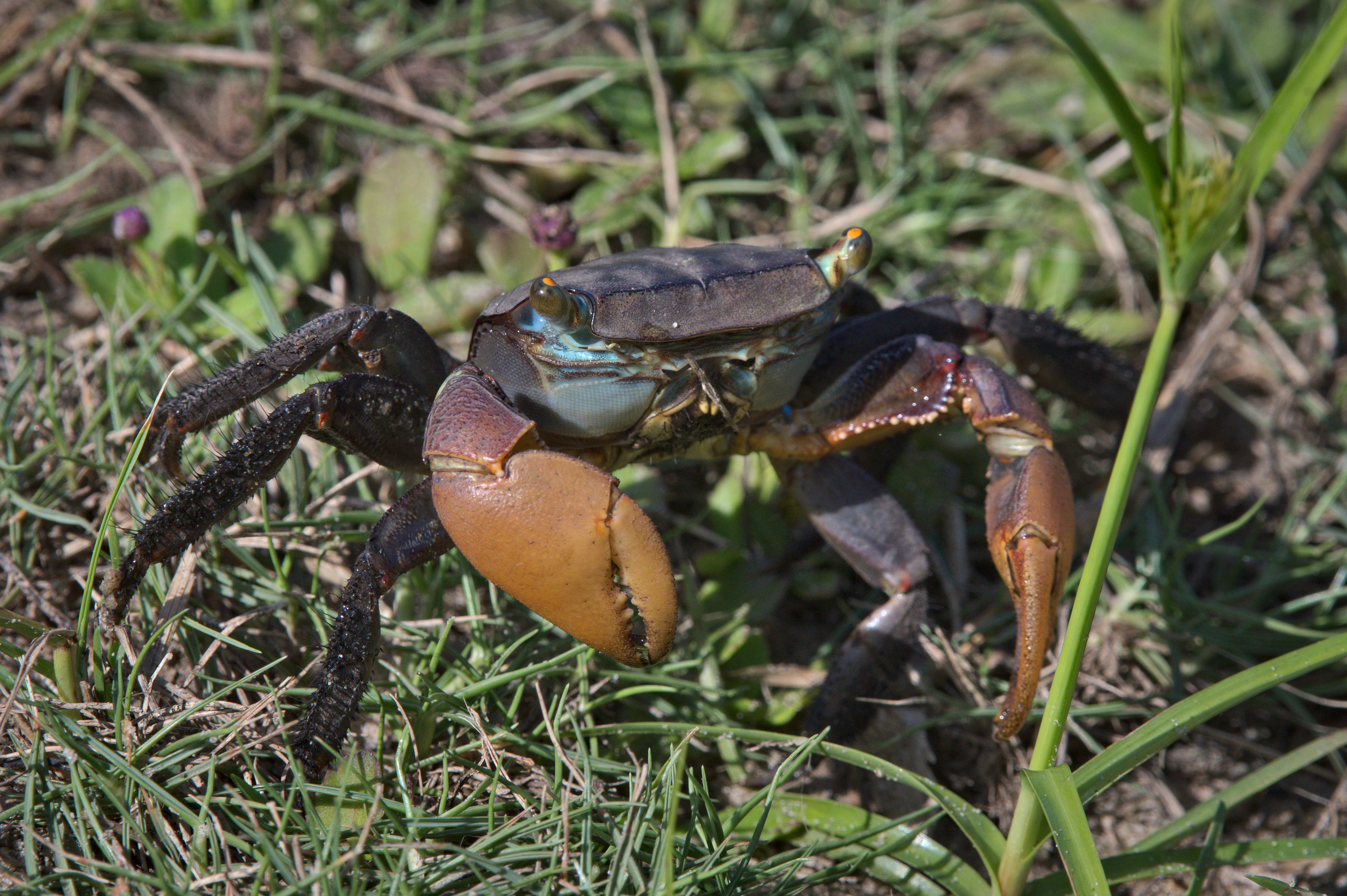
In Angola

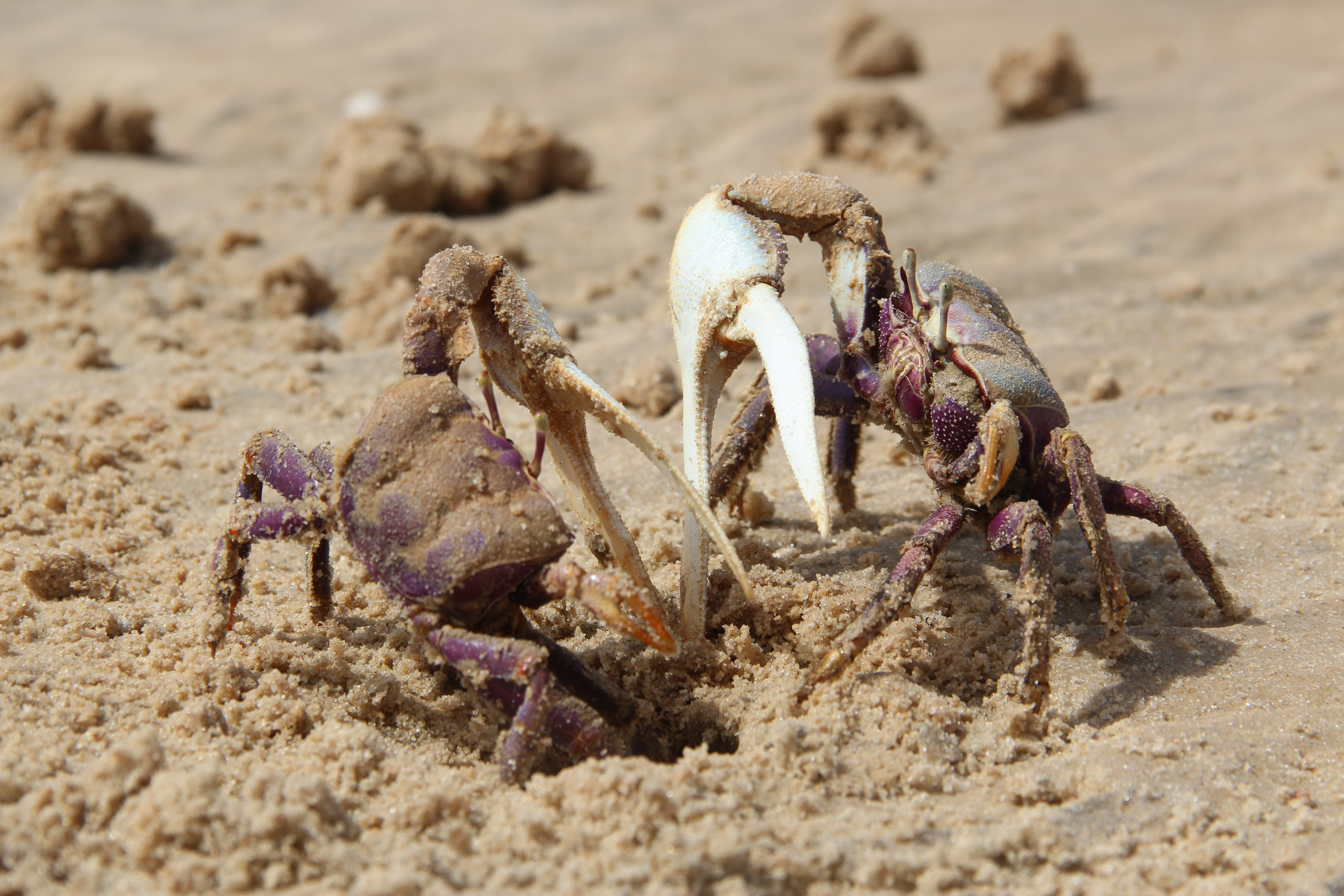
Two males fighting over a burrow in Morocco

Afruca is a genus of fiddler crabs belonging to the family Ocypodidae. Afruca tangeri, the only species in this genus, lives along the Atlantic coasts of western Africa and southwestern Europe.

== Taxonomy ==
Afruca tangeri was first described by Joseph Fortuné Théodore Eydoux in 1835 as Gelasimus tangeri, but for many years it was part of the genus Uca, which at that time contained all fiddler crabs worldwide. Fiddler crabs, and all crabs in the family Ocipodidae, have undergone a major taxonomic revision using new molecular phylogenetic evidence, which divided the fiddler crabs into 13 new genera. As a result, the West African fiddler crab now forms the only species in the new genus Afruca. The specific epithet tangeri refers to the Gulf of Tangier, Morocco, the species' type locality. The common name preferred by the Food and Agriculture Organization is West African fiddler crab (French: gélasime africain; Portuguese: boca-cava-terra).

This species was historically misclassified as Uca major, which refers to the American populations. To distinguish American and East Atlantic species, the East Atlantic species was named Uca tangeri. In 1975, Crane established the subgenus Afruca for the broad-front fiddler crab, which occurs in the eastern Atlantic Ocean. Later, authors placed this species, as well as the American narrow-front fiddler crab taxa, within the subgenus Uca. However, other authors believed Afruca was legitimate based on larval data and should be a distinct group.

== Description ==
Afruca tangeri is one of the largest species of fiddler crab, with a carapace up to 50 mm (2.0 in) wide and up to 25 mm (1.0 in) long. Males have one claw much larger than the other, used for communication. Body coloration is generally dull; however, some individuals display a range of colors from shades of brown to bright orange, red, or purple.

In adults, the carapace typically reaches about 35 mm (1.4 in). The dorsal surface of the carapace is mainly covered with tubercles, and the species lacks posterolateral striae. The frontal region between the eyes is broad, and the cornea is round. The eyestalks are thin and elongated. The orbital floor bears a spinous tubercle near the inner corner of the eye socket, appearing as a small, pointed projection.

The mouthparts are equipped with spoon-shaped setae (hair-like structures) that facilitate food handling. Additionally, a small proximal spine works in conjunction with these setae to aid in the manipulation and movement of food. Male individuals have a large claw, known as the major cheliped, which may occur on either the right or left side. The movable parts of the claws are called the fingers and are thick and strongly curved. The pollex (lower finger) has a raised ridge along its underside, enhancing strength and grip. The outer surface of the major manus (the main part of the claw) has large tubercles.

Females lack an oversized claw. Instead, both claws are small and similar in size. The abdomen lacks a pleonal locking system, which is located on the underside and sometimes serves to stabilize the abdominal flap.

== Habitat and distribution ==
Afruca tangeri can be found anywhere from the southern Portugal southwards to Angola. The species is the only fiddler crab on the eastern Atlantic coast and the most abundant crab species in The Gambia.

The general habitat of A. tangeri's consists of intertidal mudflats and estuaries. Specific microhabitats include mudflat zones, creeks and marshes. Smaller A. tangeri often cohabit near creeks, whereas larger A. tangeri more commonly reside in salt marsh zones. Young crabs are found in the middle of mudflats.

== Behavior ==
This organism is known for its extensive signaling and territorial behavior. Using both claw waving and substrate drumming around the entrances to their burrows, they attempt to attract females while also signaling to their rival males to retreat. As females get closer in proximity to the burrows which would demonstrate that signaling plays a significant role in both the courtship process and female choice. Research has also found that males may also build structures with mud at the entrances of their burrow as another visual signal to influence both potential female mates and to deter possible competition

A. tangeri is versatile in its behaviors. Known behaviors include claw waving, burrowing, combat, feeding, and various courtship sequences. Most notably, its ability to visually signal is characteristic of this species. An example of a visual signal is claw waving. Here, males signal to females with their claws and mud balls to enhance visibility. Signal intensity increases as females get closer. This behavior is also involved in courtship sequences. Males perform a four-step courtship routine, which involves low-intensity claw waving, sequential waves and body drops, simultaneous waves and body drops, and underground drumming in burrows.

This species also utilizes acoustic communication. This involves producing drumming and vibrations through the ground, which is a burrow-centered behavior. Males both wave and drum the substrate to attract females. This is an example of multimodal communication. Specifically, males signal at the burrow entrance, which causes females to approach, after which the males retreat into the burrow. This behavior illustrates the link between territory and reproduction in this species. Waving functions in mate attraction. For example, high-intensity waving increases when females are present, which explains why signaling occurs. During courtship and mating, females trigger this high-intensity waving, and males change behavior depending on female versus male stimuli. Afruca tangeri has unique activity patterns, which cause variations in behavior by time of day and tidal rhythm.

== Life cycle ==
Courtship plays a crucial role in Afruca tangeri's reproductive process and involves factors such as female choice and signal intensity. Male courtship involves claw waving as a signal to attract females. Female mate choice is based on male behavioral signals. Burrowing is also used in reproduction and mating systems, which demonstrates sexual selection. In terms of the life cycle, juveniles can live in different environments than adults. For example, small crabs are often near creeks, larger crabs near salt marshes, and juveniles in the mid-mudflat. This demonstrates how size influences habitat and can result in habitat shifts.

== Ecological role ==
=== Predation ===
This species serves as prey for avian predators. Afruca tangeri may be preferential prey because females lack a larger claw. Afruca tangeri shows no conspicuous coloration on the carapace but focuses attention on frontal regions, such as the mouth and claws, which are directed at females. Researchers found that males are more conspicuous than females to avian predators. There is a female-biased differential predation. Since females do not experience differential predation, they are less conspicuous. Male signaling (claw waving) and signal properties such as claw reflectance place males at a greater risk of visual predation compared to females. The difference between claw and mouth conspicuousness versus carapace conspicuousness demonstrates that males maximize the conspicuousness of display elements visible to conspecifics rather than to avian predators. Here, they maximize conspicuousness to conspecifics while minimizing it to predators. In response, the crabs modify their habitat. For example, males create mud balls near burrows to alter the microhabitat and affect visibility and interactions with predators.

Prey availability is shaped by prey behavior, specifically risk-taking behavior. For example, crabs need to leave their burrows to feed, which exposes them to predators. Crabs face an ecological tradeoff. Staying near their burrow provides less food but lower risk, whereas leaving the burrow offers more food but greater risk of predation.

A. tangeri's size also dictates behavior. Smaller individuals stay near the burrow to avoid risk, while larger individuals travel farther and feed in groups. Because they require more food and need to graze larger areas, they are forced into riskier behaviors.

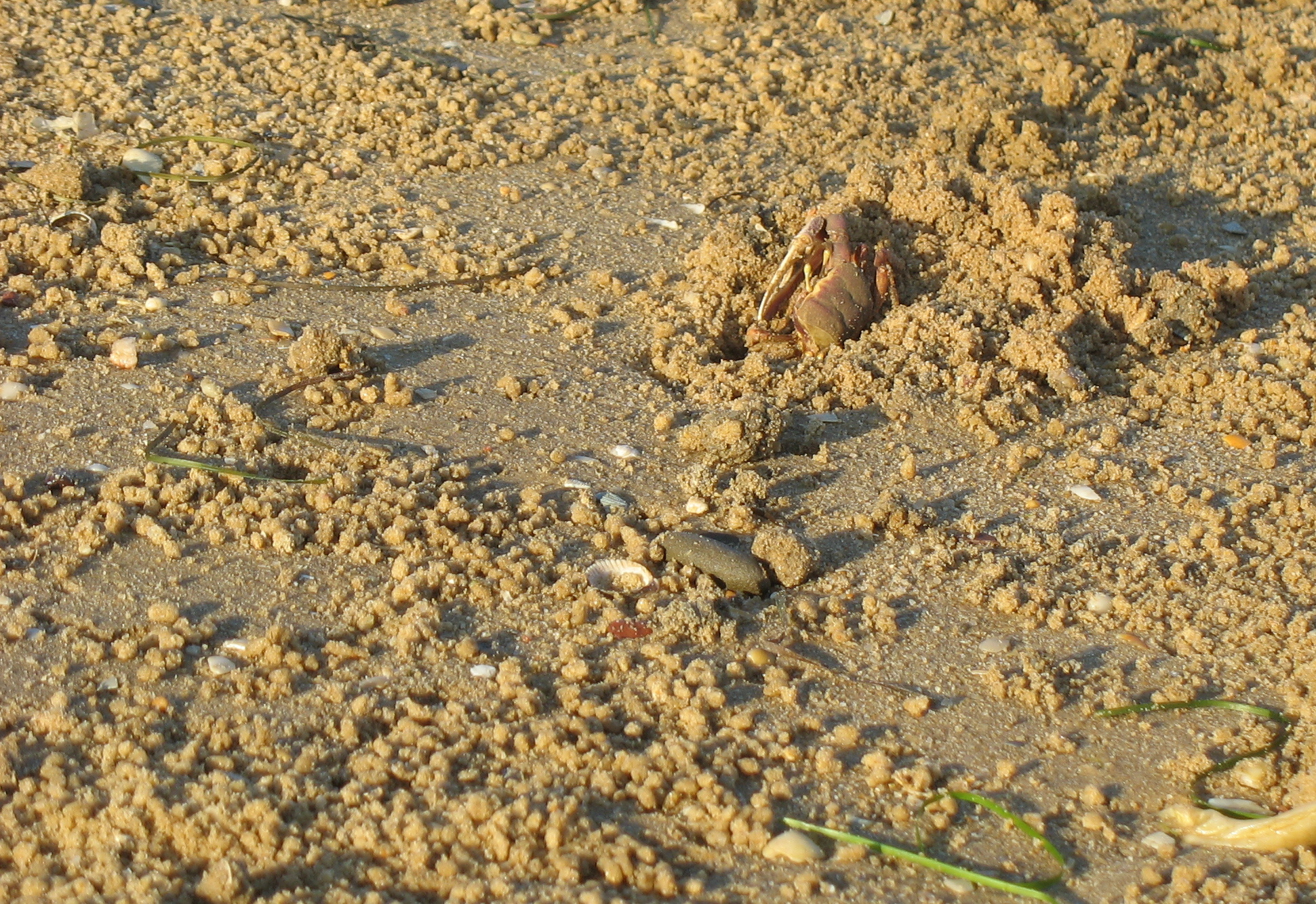
Burrows

=== Habitat ===
Afruca tangeri resides in burrows. They are used as a refuge from predators, facilitate the moistening of the gills when the tide is low, serve as good habitats during the winter, and are integral to courtship and reproduction. Each crab occupies its own burrow except when two or more seek refuge together for a short time. They use their burrows for about one week, after which they will either make a new one or take over another burrow. Once vacated, they decay and fill with sediment within two to three weeks. These are always constructed in the same shape and are built into the sediment at an angle. Structurally, they begin with a slowly descending section, then bend at 45 degrees and descend again, ending in a chamber with a diameter of around 8–10 cm. Most burrows only have one entrance, but few have two, and some have blind entrances. All of the burrows of Afruca tangeri contain air in the upper two-thirds and water in the lower third. When the tides are high, mud fully covers the burrow's entrance. Burrow size varies depending on crab size and season. The largest burrows are built in late autumn to increase oxygen supply for the winter and allow crabs to stay inside for longer without needing to open the entrance for air. Deeper burrows are also safer in harsh weather conditions.

Central to this species' ecology is their habitat— burrows. Burrows provide many benefits to this organism which include but are not limited to protection from predators, maintaining moisture around the gills when the tide gets low, are important shelter during harsh weather, and are critical sites for mating.

=== Feeding Behavior ===
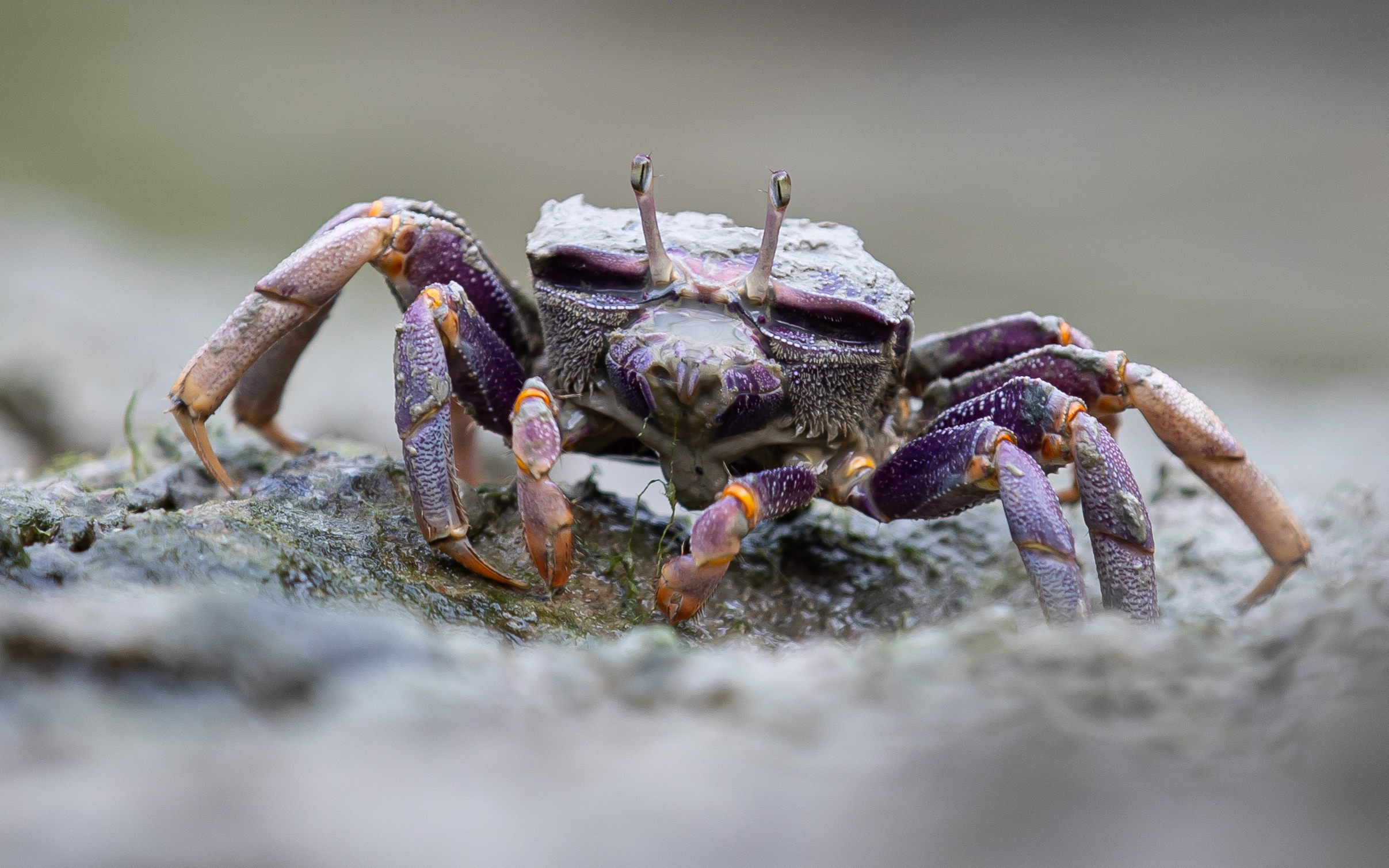
Feeding

Afruca tangeri is an omnivorous animal. It feeds on various food items found in its habitats, including detritus, diatoms, and algae. Although it has a varied diet, this species prefers plant material. Therefore, its feeding behavior has a significant impact on the ecological conditions of mangrove forests through the removal of dead leaves. Using its small claws, Afruca tangeri scrapes off the top layer of sediment. Then, in its mouth cavity, particles in sediments are sorted, and either ingested or dropped off on the ground as individual particle pellets. The presence of this crab is indicated by the mud balls that pile up in front of its burrow entrances. This behavior also has ecological importance; it not only controls algae populations in the sediment during spring and summer, but also bioturbates the wetland substrate to prevent the formation of anaerobic conditions.

Lastly, this organism also demonstrates an interesting tradeoff between predation risk and feeding. That is, it is in the best interest for smaller individuals to remain close to their burrows while feeding but larger crabs are more likely (and safer) to travel farther away and forage in groups. The main diet for this species is algae, detritus, and other plants residing on surface sediment. In addition, its feeding behavior facilitates in the aeration of wetland soils and the recycling of nutrients in mudflat ecosystems.

== Research and Scientific Importance ==
Afruca tangeri is used to study courtship signaling, sexual selection, mate choice, and competition. These are all observable behaviors that help researchers test evolutionary theories. Understanding behavioral ecology requires attention to risk-taking behavior of prey. For example, crabs leave their burrows, which serve as safe refuges, but become more vulnerable to predation while feeding. This also contributes to predator-prey theory, which states that prey availability depends on predator behavior, prey behavior, and their interactions. This species helps scientists understand why some prey are easier to catch than others and how predator behavior impacts overall success.
