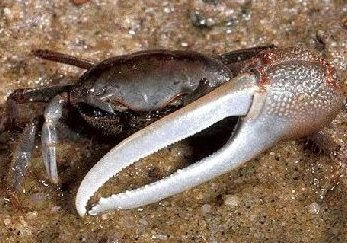
- Red-jointed fiddler crab (Minuca minax)

Scientific classification
- Kingdom: Animalia
- Phylum: Arthropoda
- Clade: Pancrustacea
- Class: Malacostraca
- Order: Decapoda
- Suborder: Pleocyemata
- Infraorder: Brachyura
- Superfamily: Ocypodoidea
- Family: Ocypodidae

Groups included
- Gelasiminae Miers, 1886; Ucinae Dana, 1851

= Fiddler crab =

Fiddler crab Temporal range: Early Miocene-recent

Genus of crabs

The fiddler crab or calling crab is any of the hundred species of semiterrestrial marine crabs in the family Ocypodidae. These crabs are well known for their extreme sexual dimorphism, where the male crabs have a major claw significantly larger than their minor claw, whilst females' claws are both the same size. The name fiddler crab comes from the appearance of their small and large claw together, looking similar to a fiddle.

A smaller number of ghost crab and mangrove crab species are also found in the family Ocypodidae. This entire group is composed of small crabs, the largest being Afruca tangeri which is slightly over two inches (5 cm) across. Fiddler crabs are found along sea beaches and brackish intertidal mud flats, lagoons, swamps, and various other types of brackish or salt-water wetlands. Whilst fiddler crabs are currently split into two subfamilies of Gelasiminae and Ucinae, there is still phylogenetic and taxonomical debate as to whether the movement from the overall genus of Uca to these subfamilies and the separate 11 genera.

Like all crabs, fiddler crabs shed their shells as they grow. If they have lost legs or claws during their present growth cycle, a new one will be present when they molt. If the major claw is lost, males will regenerate one on the same side after their next molt. Newly molted crabs are very vulnerable because of their soft shells. They are reclusive and hide until the new shell hardens.

In a controlled laboratory setting, fiddler crabs exhibit a constant circadian rhythm that mimics the ebb and flow of the tides: they turn dark during the day and light at night.

== Ecology and life cycle ==
=== Habitat and diet ===
Fiddler crabs primarily exist upon mudflats, sandy or muddy beaches as well as salt marshes within mangroves. Fiddler crabs are found in West Africa, the Western Atlantic, the Eastern Pacific, Indo-Pacific and Algarve region of Portugal.

Whilst the fiddler crab is classified as an omnivore, it does present itself as an opportunist and will consume anything with nutritional value. The crab will feed through bringing a chunk of sediment to its mouth and sifting through it to extract organic material. This crab will filter out algae, microbes, fungus or any form of detritus. Once finished consuming all the organic matter from the sediment, these crabs will then deposit them as small sand balls near their burrow.

Fiddler crabs are thought to potentially act as ecosystem engineers within their habitat due to the way they rework the sediment during feeding. Whilst these crabs do rework the sediment around them, upturning the very top layer and depositing it nearby, there is still debate that exists as to whether this turnover of sediment has any proven difference regarding nutrients and aeration of the sediment.

=== Burrows ===
Fiddler crabs are a burrowing species, where within their territory they may possess several burrows. There are two types of burrows that the fiddler crabs can build, either breeding burrows or temporary burrows. Temporary burrows are constructed by both males and females during high tide periods. These burrows are also constructed at night time when the crabs are no longer feeding and are hiding from predators. Breeding burrows are constructed by solely males, and will be constructed within the area that they have deemed their territory. These breeding burrows are constructed by male crabs so that the female and male crabs may copulate within the burrow, and the female may deposit and incubate her eggs within this area. Larger males who can more easily defend their territory will often have multiple suitable breeding burrows within their territory to enable them to mate with multiple female crabs. Female crabs are found to prefer to mate with males that have the widest burrows, however, carapace width and claw size does correlate with the width of the burrow, so could be a potential size bias.

=== Roles ===
Two types of fiddler crabs are found to exist within a given territory, a wandering female or male, and territory-holding male or females. When in a wandering state, this means crabs do not currently occupy a burrow. They will wander in order to look for territory which contains a burrow, or to look for a mate. Wandering females will look for a mate to copulate with, usually preferring to mate with a male that currently possesses a burrow. The female fiddler carries her eggs in a mass on the underside of her body. She remains in her burrow during a two-week gestation period, after which she ventures out to release her eggs into the receding tide. The larvae remain planktonic for a further two weeks.

The mating system of fiddler crabs is thought to be mainly polygynous, where the male crabs will mate with multiple females if they have the opportunity to, however, female fiddler crabs such as the Austruca lactea are known to also mate with multiple males.

=== Moulting ===
As they are a species of crustacean, they perform ecdysis, which is the process of moulting. When crabs moult, they produce hormones which trigger the shedding of their exoskeleton and regeneration of limbs. Moulting is already an extremely stressful time for fiddler crabs, as their shell becomes extremely soft, leaving them vulnerable to predation. When undergoing this moulting cycle, crabs will frequently hide within their burrows to avoid harm. When male crabs are undergoing the moulting process, if they are exposed to other male crabs in high grouping with consistent light, their ability to regenerate limbs will be impaired.

=== Claw ===
Whilst the crabs major claw does function as a tool for fighting and competition, it also plays a role in thermoregulation. As the claw is so large, and these crabs live in generally hot territory, so require strategies to keep themselves cool, particularly for wandering males without burrows. The presence of the major claw upon the male helps them keep their body temperature regulated, and decreases the chance of them losing or gaining too much heat in a given time period. The large claw draws away excess body heat from the core of the fiddler crab and allows it to dissipate. Heat is found to dissipate significantly faster when male crabs are performing waving at the same time.

=== Appearance ===
Fiddler crabs come in many different colourations and patterns, and are known to be able to change their colour over time. Fiddler crabs such as the Tubuca capricornis are capable of changing their colour rapidly when placed under significant stress. When fiddler crabs undergo moulting, they are seen to have reduced colouration after each sequential moult. Female fiddler crabs are traditionally more colourful than male fiddler crabs. Conspicuous colouring in fiddler crabs is dangerous as it increases predation rate, however, sexual selection argues for brightly coloured crabs. Fiddler crabs have finely tuned visual systems that aid in detecting colours of importance, which aid in selecting coloured mates. When given the choice, females prefer to pick males that are more brightly coloured in comparison to dull males.

== Behaviour and characteristics ==
General anatomy of a fiddler crab

=== Lifespan ===
Fiddler crabs live rather brief lives of no more than two years (up to three years in captivity). Male fiddler crabs use many signalling techniques and performances towards females to win over a female to mate. Females choose their mate based on claw size and also quality of the waving display.

=== Fighting ===
It is very common for male fiddler crabs to be viewed fighting against one another. Male fiddler crabs fight primarily over females and territory. Whilst fights within fiddler crabs are commonly male against male fights, male fiddler crabs will also fight against female fiddler crabs when there is suitable territory with a burrow that the male wishes to obtain. When fighting, male fiddler crabs can often have their major claw ripped off, or have it harmed to the point where male fiddler crabs must autotomize this claw. Although a claw can regrow at the next moult, its properties usually differ from the original. The regenerated claw is often similar in size but substantially weaker. Other crabs cannot readily detect this weakness and treat the claw as a full-strength signal. This constitutes dishonest signalling, where the claw's appearance misrepresents its actual performance.

=== Reproductive behaviour ===
In order for a male fiddler crab to help produce offspring, he must first attract a mate and convince her to mate with him. To win over females, male crabs will perform a waving display towards females. This waving display consists of raising the major claw upwards and then dropping it down towards itself in what appears as a 'come here' motion, like a beckoning sign. Male crabs will exhibit two forms of waving towards females to attempt to court them. Broadcast waving is a general wave the male crabs perform when a female crab is not within their field of view. This wave is at a slower pace, as to not use up energy reserves. Directed waving is performed by male crabs when they have spotted a female they wish to mate with. This wave is performed through the male crab facing towards the female, and increasing the pace of the wave towards the female.

Male lemon-yellow clawed fiddler crab (Austruca perplexa), waving his big claw in display

When males are waving at females, this is usually done in synchrony with other male crabs in the neighbouring area. Synchronous waving does provide a general positive benefit for male crabs attempting to attract wandering females, as a form of cooperative behaviour. Synchrony however, does not provide an individual benefit, as females prefer to mate with the male that is leading the synchronous wave. Therefore, synchronous waving is thought to have evolved as an incidental byproduct of males competing to lead the wave.

Male crabs also participate in a drumming behavior at the entrances of their burrows as another way to attract female to mate

Fiddler crabs are also known to build sedimentary pillars around their burrows out of mud and sand. 49 of the total species under the family Ocypodidae will construct sedimentary pillars outside of their burrows for the purposes of courtship and defense from other crabs. These structures can be built by either male or female crabs and will be one of the six known structures constructed by fiddler crabs. Fiddler crabs can build either a chimney, hood, pillar, semidome, mudball or rim. These mud pillars have correlations with sediment type, genus and sex. Females are more likely to be attracted to a male if he has a sedimentary pillar outside of his burrow in comparison to a male crab without a pillar. When females are not actively being courted, they are more likely to move to an empty burrow which has a pillar present in comparison to an empty burrow without a pillar present. Fiddler crabs with any hood or dome formed pillar above their burrow are more likely to be shy crabs that take less risks.

Female crabs will choose their mate based upon the claw size of the male, as well as the quality of the waving display, if he was the leader of the synchronous waving, and if the male currently possesses territory with a burrow for them to copulate within. Females will also prefer to mate with males who have the widest and largest burrows.

=== Evolutionary conundrums ===
Fiddler crabs such as Austruca mjoebergi have been shown to bluff about their fighting ability. Upon regrowing a lost claw, a crab will occasionally regrow a weaker claw that nevertheless intimidates crabs with smaller but stronger claws. This is an example of dishonest signalling.

The dual functionality of the major claw of fiddler crabs has presented an evolutionary conundrum in that the claw mechanics best suited for fighting do not match up with the mechanics best suited for a waving display.

== Genera and species ==
More than 100 species of fiddler crabs make up 11 of the 13 genera in the crab family Ocypodidae. These were formerly members of the genus Uca. In 2016, most of the subgenera of Uca were elevated to genus rank, and the fiddler crabs now occupy 11 genera making up the subfamilies Gelasiminae and Ucinae.

- Afruca
  - Afruca tangeri (Eydoux, 1835) (West African fiddler crab)
- Austruca
  - Austruca albimana (Kossmann, 1877) (white-handed fiddler crab)
  - Austruca annulipes (H.Milne Edwards, 1837) (ring-legged fiddler crab)
  - Austruca bengali (bengal fiddler crab)
  - Austruca citrus (citrus fiddler crab)
  - Austruca cryptica (Naderloo, Türkay & Chen, 2010) (cryptic fiddler crab)
  - Austruca iranica (Pretzmann, 1971) (iranian fiddler crab)
  - Austruca lactea (De Haan, 1835) (milky fiddler crab)
  - Austruca mjoebergi (Rathbun, 1924) (banana fiddler crab)
  - Austruca occidentalis (Naderloo, Schubart & Shih, 2016) (East African fiddler crab)
  - Austruca perplexa (H.Milne Edwards, 1852) (perplexing fiddler crab)
  - Austruca sindensis (Alcock, 1900) (indus fiddler crab)
  - Austruca triangularis (A.Milne-Edwards, 1873) (triangular fiddler crab)
  - Austruca variegata (Heller, 1862) (motley fiddler crab)
- Cranuca
  - Cranuca inversa (Hoffmann, 1874)
- Gelasimus
  - Gelasimus borealis (Crane, 1975) (northern calling fiddler crab)
  - Gelasimus dampieri (Crane, 1975) (dampier's fiddler crab)
  - Gelasimus excisa (eastern calling fiddler crab)
  - Gelasimus hesperiae (Crane, 1975) (western calling fiddler crab)
  - Gelasimus jocelynae (Shih, Naruse & Ng, 2010) (jocelyn's fiddler crab)
  - Gelasimus neocultrimanus (Bott, 1973)
  - Gelasimus palustris Stimpson, 1862
  - Gelasimus pugilator Stimpson, 1862
  - Gelasimus rubripes Hombron & Jacquinot, 1846
  - Gelasimus subeylindricus Stimpson, 1862
  - Gelasimus tetragonon (Herbst, 1790) (tetragonal fiddler crab)
  - Gelasimus vocans (Linnaeus, 1758) (calling fiddler crab)
  - Gelasimus vomeris (McNeill, 1920) (orange-clawed fiddler crab)
- Leptuca
  - Leptuca batuenta (Crane, 1941) (beating fiddler crab)
  - Leptuca beebei (Crane, 1941) (Beebe's fiddler crab)
  - Leptuca coloradensis (Rathbun, 1893) (painted fiddler crab)
  - Leptuca crenulata (Lockington, 1877) (Mexican fiddler crab)
  - Leptuca cumulanta (Crane, 1943) (heaping fiddler crab)
  - Leptuca deichmanni (Rathbun, 1935) (Deichmann's fiddler crab)
  - Leptuca dorotheae (von Hagen, 1968) (Dorothy's fiddler crab)
  - Leptuca festae (Nobili, 1902) (Festa's fiddler crab)
  - Leptuca helleri (Rathbun, 1902) (Heller's fiddler crab)
  - Leptuca inaequalis (Rathbun, 1935) (uneven fiddler crab)
  - Leptuca latimanus (Rathbun, 1893) (lateral-handed fiddler crab)
  - Leptuca leptodactyla (Rathbun, 1898) (thin-fingered fiddler crab)
  - Leptuca limicola (Crane, 1941) (Pacific mud fiddler crab)
  - Leptuca musica (Rathbun, 1914) (musical fiddler crab)
  - Leptuca oerstedi (Rathbun, 1904) (aqua fiddler crab)
  - Leptuca panacea (Novak & Salmon, 1974) (gulf sand fiddler crab)
  - Leptuca pugilator (Bosc, 1802) (Atlantic sand fiddler crab)
  - Leptuca pygmaea (Crane, 1941) (pygmy fiddler crab)
  - Leptuca saltitanta (Crane, 1941) (energetic fiddler crab)
  - Leptuca speciosa (Ives, 1891) (brilliant fiddler crab)
  - Leptuca spinicarpa (Rathbun, 1900) (spiny-wristed fiddler crab)
  - Leptuca stenodactylus (Milne-Edwards & Lucas, 1843) (narrow-fingered fiddler crab)
  - Leptuca subcylindrica (Stimpson, 1859) (Laguna Madre fiddler crab)
  - Leptuca tallanica (von Hagen, 1968) (Peruvian fiddler crab)
  - Leptuca tenuipedis (Crane, 1941) (slender-legged fiddler crab)
  - Leptuca terpsichores (Crane, 1941) (dancing fiddler crab)
  - Leptuca thayeri M. J. Rathbun, 1900 (Atlantic mangrove fiddler crab)
  - Leptuca tomentosa (Crane, 1941) (matted fiddler crab)
  - Leptuca umbratila (Crane, 1941) (Pacific mangrove fiddler crab)
  - Leptuca uruguayensis (Nobili, 1901) (Uruguayan fiddler crab)
- Minuca
  - Minuca argillicola (Crane, 1941) (clay fiddler crab)
  - Minuca brevifrons (Stimpson, 1860) (narrow-fronted fiddler crab)
  - Minuca burgersi (Holthuis, 1967) (burger's fiddler crab)
  - Minuca ecuadoriensis (Maccagno, 1928) (Pacific hairback fiddler crab)
  - Minuca galapagensis (galápagos fiddler crab)
  - Minuca herradurensis (Bott, 1954) (la herradura fiddler crab)
  - Minuca longisignalis (Salmon & Atsaides, 1968) (longwave gulf fiddler)
  - Minuca marguerita (Thurman, 1981) (olmec fiddler crab)
  - Minuca minax (Le Conte, 1855) (red-jointed fiddler crab)
  - Minuca mordax (Smith, 1870) (biting fiddler crab)
  - Minuca osa (Landstorfer & Schubart, 2010) (osa fiddler crab)
  - Minuca pugnax (S. I. Smith, 1870) (Atlantic marsh fiddler crab)
  - Minuca rapax (Smith, 1870) (mudflat fiddler crab)
  - Minuca umbratila Crane, 1941 (Pacific mangrove fiddler crab)
  - Minuca victoriana (von Hagen, 1987) (victorian fiddler crab)
  - Minuca virens (Salmon & Atsaides, 1968) (green-banded fiddler crab)
  - Minuca vocator (Herbst, 1804) (Atlantic hairback fiddler crab)
  - Minuca zacae (Crane, 1941) (lesser Mexican fiddler crab)
- Paraleptuca
  - Paraleptuca boninensis (Shih, Komai & Liu, 2013) (bonin islands fiddler crab)
  - Paraleptuca chlorophthalmus (H.Milne Edwards, 1837) (green-eyed fiddler crab)
  - Paraleptuca crassipes (White, 1847) (thick-legged fiddler crab)
  - Paraleptuca splendida (Stimpson, 1858) (splendid fiddler crab)
- Petruca
  - Petruca panamensis Ng, Shih & Christy, 2015
- Tubuca
  - Tubuca acuta (Stimpson, 1858) (acute fiddler crab)
  - Tubuca alcocki Shih, Chan & Ng, 2018 (alcock's fiddler crab)
  - Tubuca arcuata (De Haan, 1835) (bowed fiddler crab)
  - Tubuca australiae (Crane, 1975)
  - Tubuca bellator (White, 1847) (belligerent fiddler crab)
  - Tubuca capricornis (Crane, 1975) (capricorn fiddler crab)
  - Tubuca coarctata (H.Milne Edwards, 1852) (compressed fiddler crab)
  - Tubuca demani (Ortmann, 1897) (demanding fiddler crab)
  - Tubuca dussumieri (H.Milne Edwards, 1852) (dussumier's fiddler crab)
  - Tubuca elegans (George & Jones, 1982) (elegant fiddler crab)
  - Tubuca flammula (Crane, 1975) (flame-backed fiddler crab)
  - Tubuca forcipata (Adams & White, 1849) (forceps fiddler crab)
  - Tubuca hirsutimanus (George & Jones, 1982) (hairy-handed fiddler crab)
  - Tubuca longidigitum (Kingsley, 1880) (long-fingered fiddler crab)
  - Tubuca paradussumieri (Bott, 1973) (spined fiddler crab)
  - Tubuca polita (Crane, 1975) (polished fiddler crab)
  - Tubuca rhizophorae (Tweedie, 1950) (Asian mangrove fiddler crab)
  - Tubuca rosea (Tweedie, 1937) (rose fiddler crab)
  - Tubuca seismella (Crane, 1975) (shaking fiddler crab)
  - Tubuca signata (Hess, 1865) (signaling fiddler crab)
  - Tubuca typhoni (Crane, 1975) (typhoon fiddler crab)
  - Tubuca urvillei (H.Milne Edwards, 1852) (d'urville's fiddler crab)
- Uca
  - †Uca antiqua Brito, 1972
  - Uca heteropleura (Smith, 1870) (American Red fiddler crab)
  - †Uca inaciobritoi Martins-Neto, 2001
  - Uca insignis (H.Milne Edwards, 1852) (distinguished fiddler crab)
  - Uca intermedia von Prahl & Toro, 1985 (intermediate fiddler crab)
  - Uca major Herbst, 1782 (greater fiddler crab)
  - †Uca marinae Dominguez-Alonso, 2008
  - Uca maracoani Latreille 1803 (Brazilian fiddler crab)
  - Uca monilifera Rathbun, 1914 (necklaced fiddler crab)
  - †Uca nitida Desmarest, 1822
  - †Uca oldroydi Rathbun, 1926
  - Uca ornata (Smith, 1870) (ornate fiddler crab)
  - Uca princeps (Smith, 1870) (large Mexican fiddler crab)
  - Uca stylifera (H.Milne Edwards, 1852) (styled fiddler crab)
  - Uca subcylindrica Stimpson, 1862 (Laguna Madre fiddler)
- Xeruca
  - Xeruca formosensis (Rathbun, 1921)

== Gallery ==
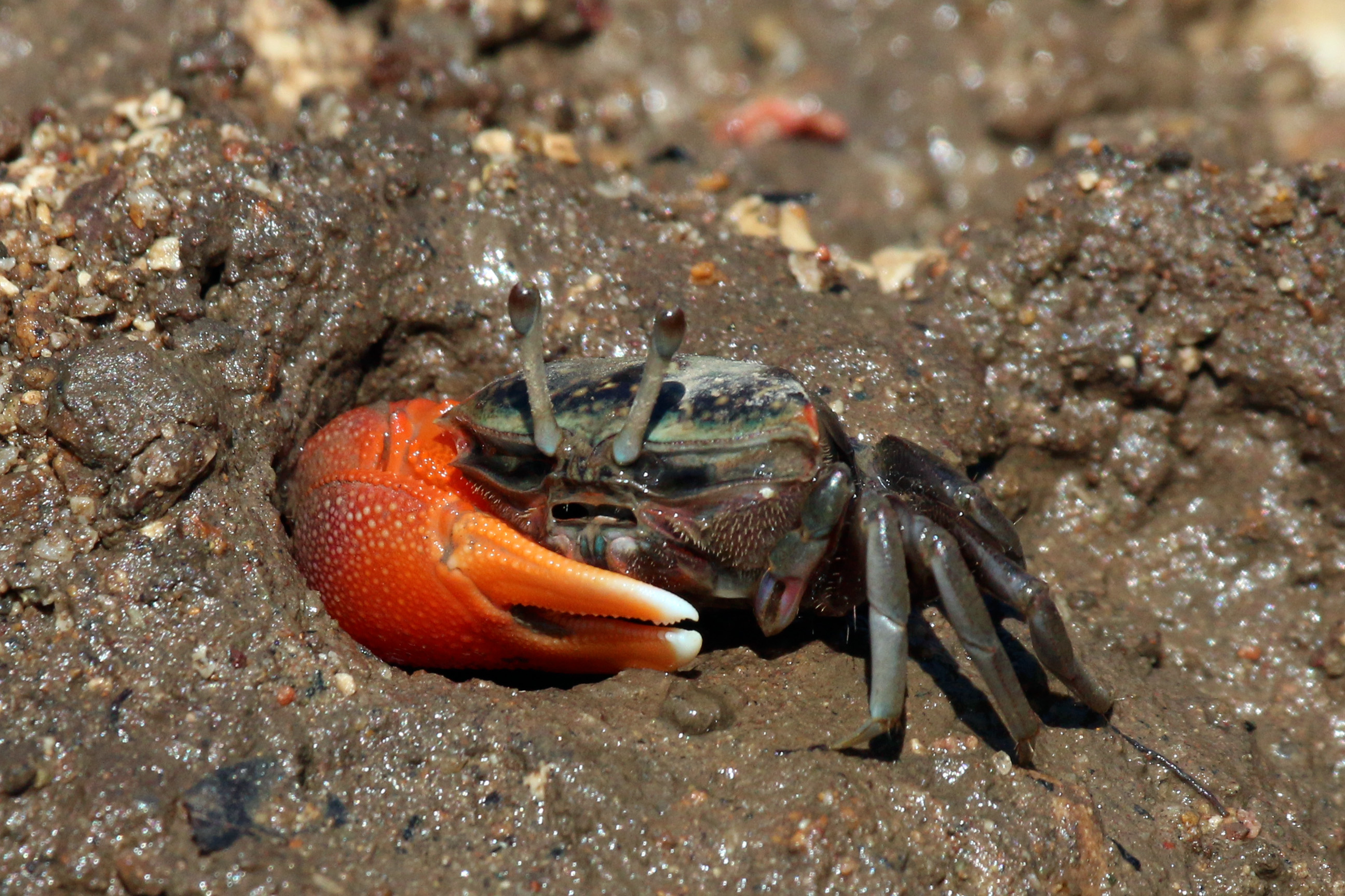
Compressed fiddler crab
Tubuca coarctata male in Rinca, Indonesia

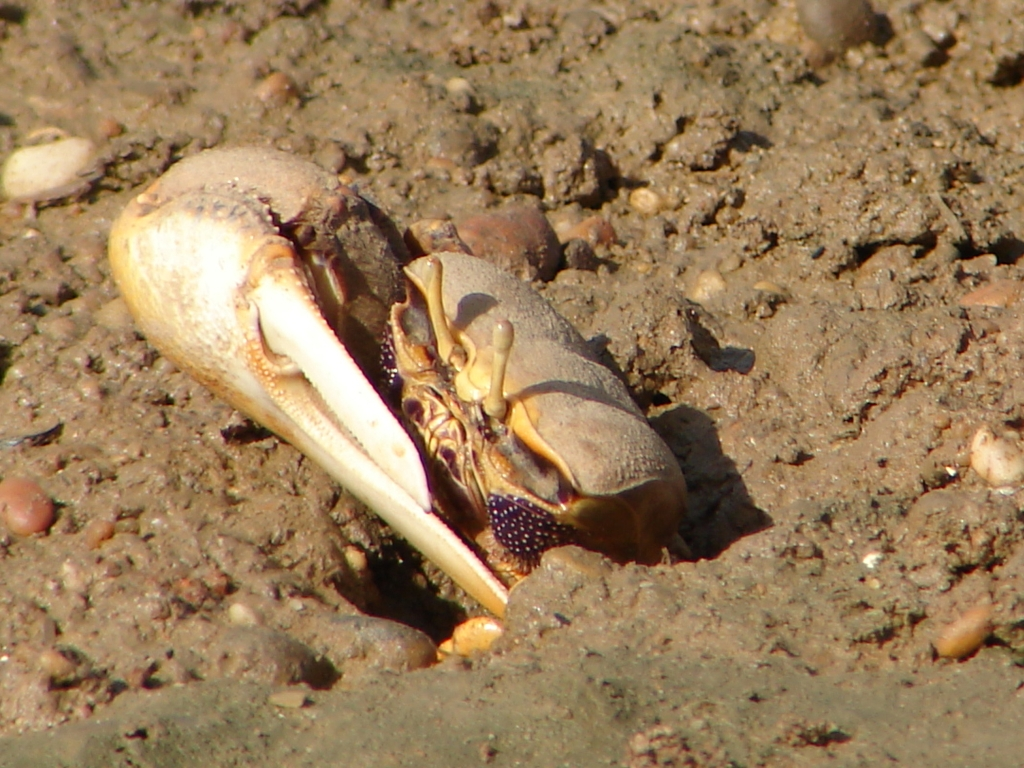
Afruca tangeri

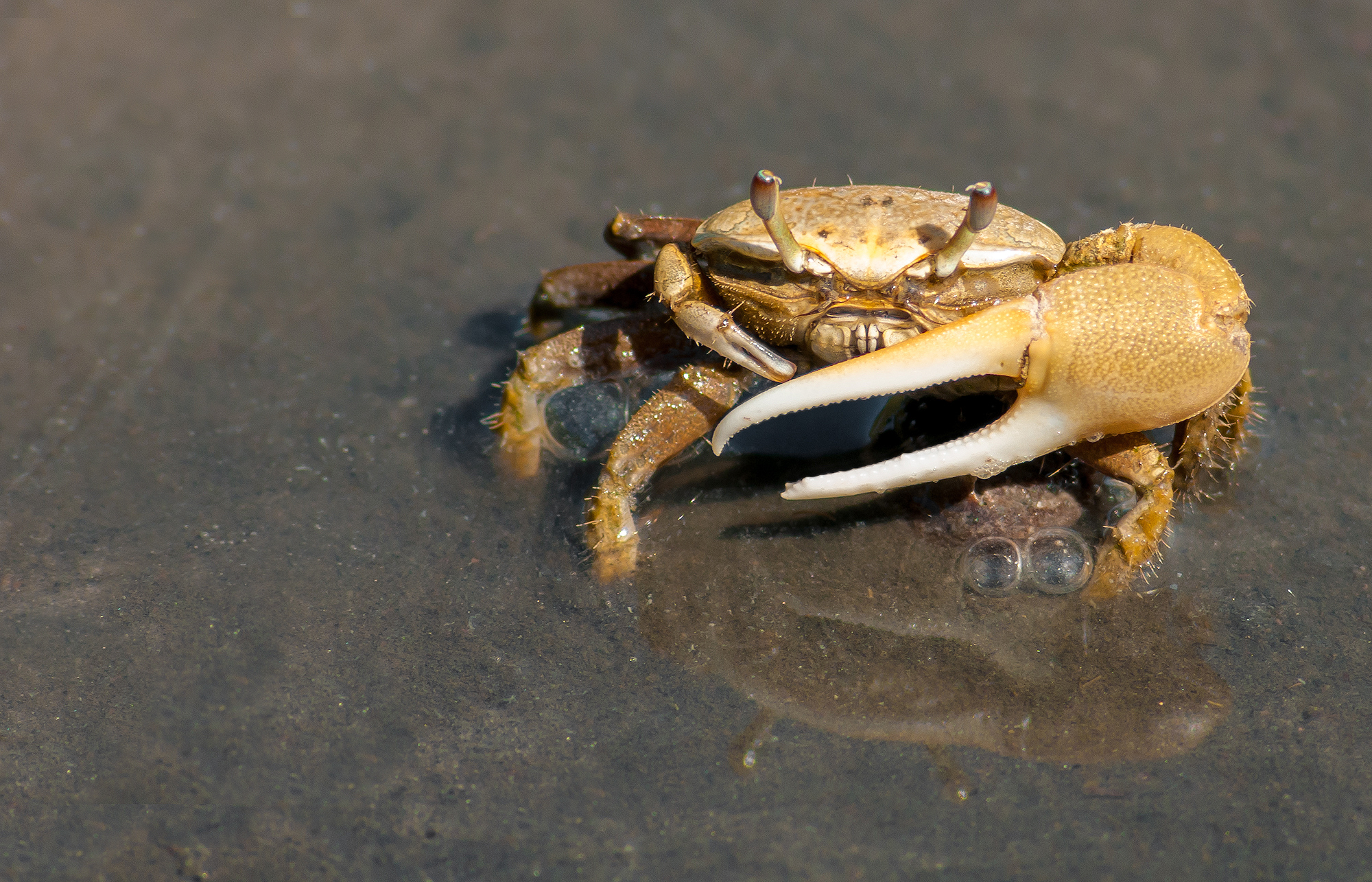
Leptuca leptodactyla in El Guamache, Margarita Island, Venezuela

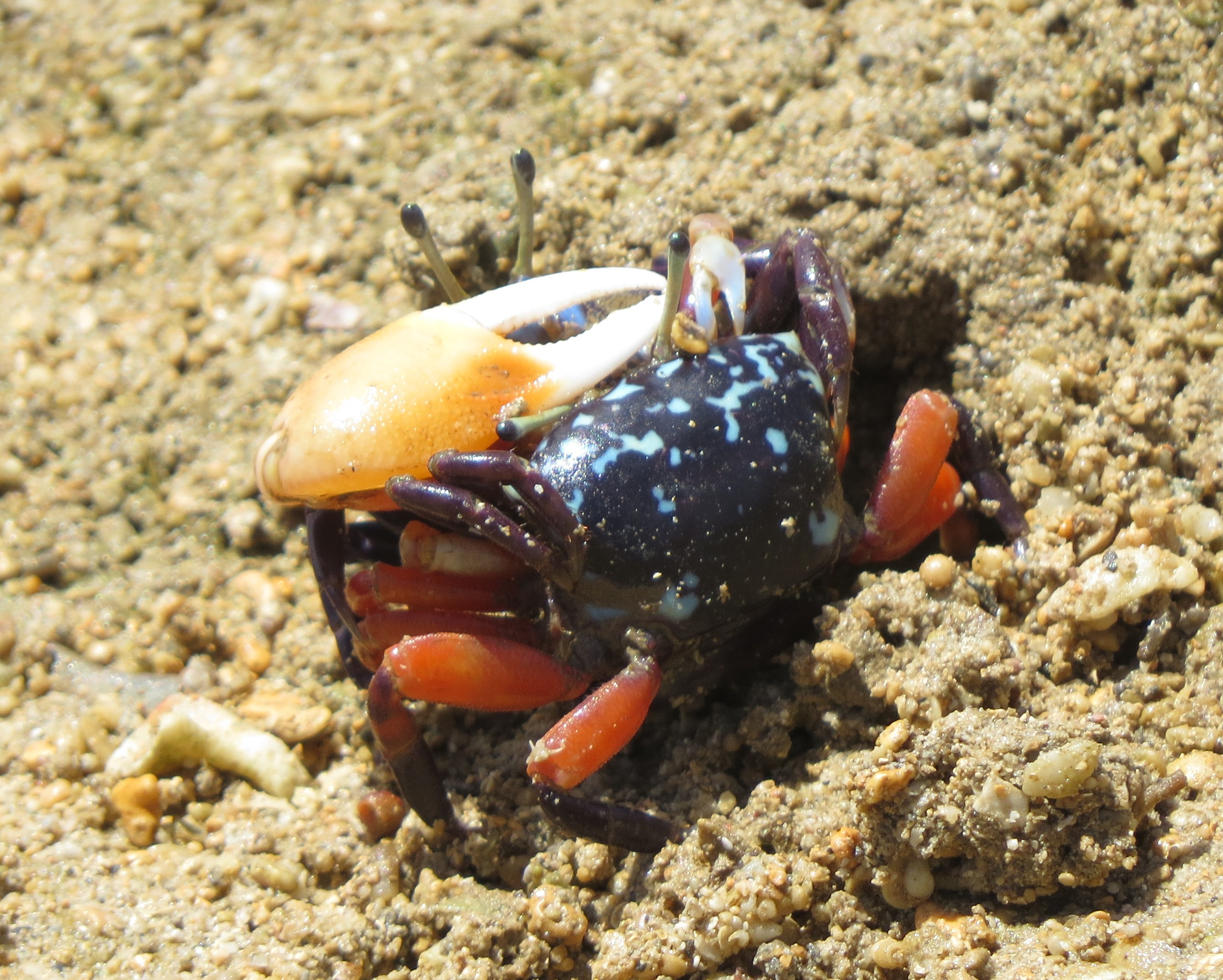
Gelasimus tetragonon copulation, Amami Island, Japan

Paraleptuca chlorophthalmus - Okinawa, Japan

The obvious asymmetry of male fiddler crabs makes them useful figures in illustrating the non-orientability of certain geometric objects, like the Möbius strip shown here.

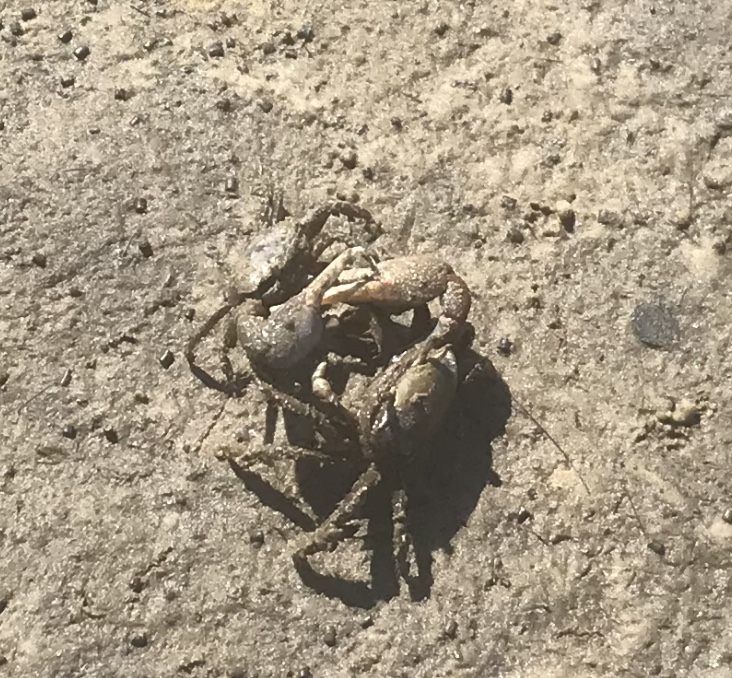
Fiddler crabs fighting in Belle Hall, Mount Pleasant, South Carolina in March 2023

== Captivity ==
Fiddler crabs are occasionally kept as pets. The fiddler crabs sold in pet stores generally come from brackish water lagoons. Because they live in lower salinity water, pet stores may call them fresh-water crabs, but they cannot survive indefinitely in fresh water. Fiddler crabs have been known to attack small fish in captivity, as opposed to their natural feeding habits.

== See also ==
- Declawing of crabs
