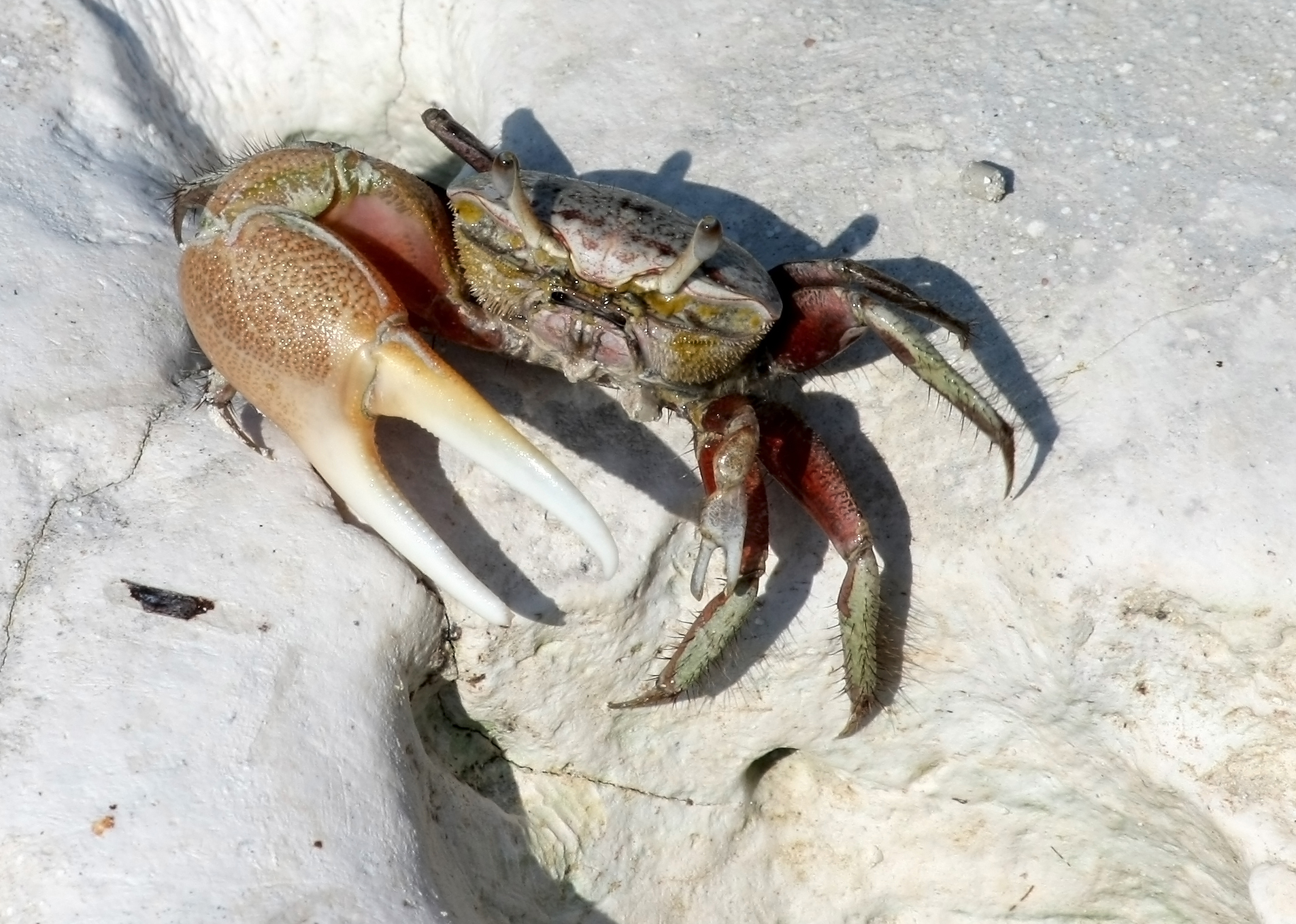

Scientific classification
- Domain: Eukaryota
- Kingdom: Animalia
- Phylum: Arthropoda
- Class: Malacostraca
- Order: Decapoda
- Suborder: Pleocyemata
- Infraorder: Brachyura
- Family: Ocypodidae
- Subfamily: Gelasiminae
- Tribe: Minucini
- Genus: Leptuca; Bott, 1973

= Leptuca =

Genus of crabs

Leptuca is a genus of fiddler crabs belonging to the family Ocypodidae.

The species of this genus are found on the coasts of the Americas.

== Description ==
They are small- to large-sized crabs with an adult carapace width of 5–25 mm in adults. The front of their carapace is broad and they have short anterolateral margins with 0–2 posterolateral striae on the top of the carapace.

== Species ==
There are currently 30 species in the genus:

- Leptuca batuenta (Crane, 1941) (beating fiddler crab)
- Leptuca beebei (Crane, 1941) (Beebe's fiddler crab)
- Leptuca coloradensis (Rathbun, 1893) (painted fiddler crab)
- Leptuca crenulata (Lockington, 1877) (Mexican fiddler crab)
- Leptuca cumulanta (Crane, 1943) (heaping fiddler crab)
- Leptuca deichmanni (Rathbun, 1935) (Deichmann's fiddler crab)
- Leptuca dorotheae (von Hagen, 1968) (Dorothy's fiddler crab)
- Leptuca festae (Nobili, 1902) (Festa's fiddler crab)
- Leptuca helleri (Rathbun, 1902) (Heller's fiddler crab)
- Leptuca inaequalis (Rathbun, 1935) (uneven fiddler crab)
- Leptuca latimanus (Rathbun, 1893) (lateral-handed fiddler crab)
- Leptuca leptodactyla (Rathbun, 1898) (thin-fingered fiddler crab)
- Leptuca limicola (Crane, 1941) (Pacific mud fiddler crab)
- Leptuca musica (Rathbun, 1914) (musical fiddler crab)
- Leptuca oerstedi (Rathbun, 1904) (aqua fiddler crab)
- Leptuca panacea (Novak & Salmon, 1974) (gulf sand fiddler crab)
- Leptuca pugilator (Bosc, 1802) (Atlantic sand fiddler crab)
- Leptuca pygmaea (Crane, 1941) (pygmy fiddler crab)
- Leptuca saltitanta (Crane, 1941) (energetic fiddler crab)
- Leptuca speciosa (Ives, 1891) (brilliant fiddler crab)
- Leptuca spinicarpa (Rathbun, 1900) (spiny-wristed fiddler crab)
- Leptuca stenodactylus (Milne-Edwards & Lucas, 1843) (narrow-fingered fiddler crab)
- Leptuca subcylindrica (Stimpson, 1859) (Laguna Madre fiddler crab)
- Leptuca tallanica (von Hagen, 1968) (Peruvian fidder crab)
- Leptuca tenuipedis (Crane, 1941) (slender-legged fiddler crab)
- Leptuca terpsichores (Crane, 1941) (dancing fiddler crab)
- Leptuca thayeri (Rathbun, 1900) (Atlantic mangrove fiddler crab)
- Leptuca tomentosa (Crane, 1941) (matted fiddler crab)
- Leptuca umbratila (Crane, 1941) (Pacific mangrove fiddler crab)
- Leptuca uruguayensis (Nobili, 1901) (Uruguayan fiddler crab)
