= Gelasiminae =

Scientific classification
- Domain: Eukaryota
- Kingdom: Animalia
- Phylum: Arthropoda
- Class: Malacostraca
- Order: Decapoda
- Suborder: Pleocyemata
- Infraorder: Brachyura
- Family: Ocypodidae
- Subfamily: Gelasiminae; Miers, 1886

Subfamily of crabs

Gelasiminae is a subfamily that pertains to nine out of the eleven fiddler crab genera within the family Ocypodidae.

== Taxonomy ==
The subfamily includes 94 species within nine genera. The genera are split into two tribes that are geographically distant. Tribe Gelasimini consists of species native to the Indo-West Pacific whereas Tribe Minucini consists of species native to the Americas.

Tribe Gelasimini (Indo-West Pacific fiddlers):

- Austruca
- Cranuca
- Gelasimus
- Paraleptuca
- Tubuca
- Xeruca

Tribe Minucini (American broad-front fiddlers):

- Leptuca
- Minuca
- Petruca
