= Barbara Snow (ornithologist) =

English ornithologist and geologist (1921–2007)

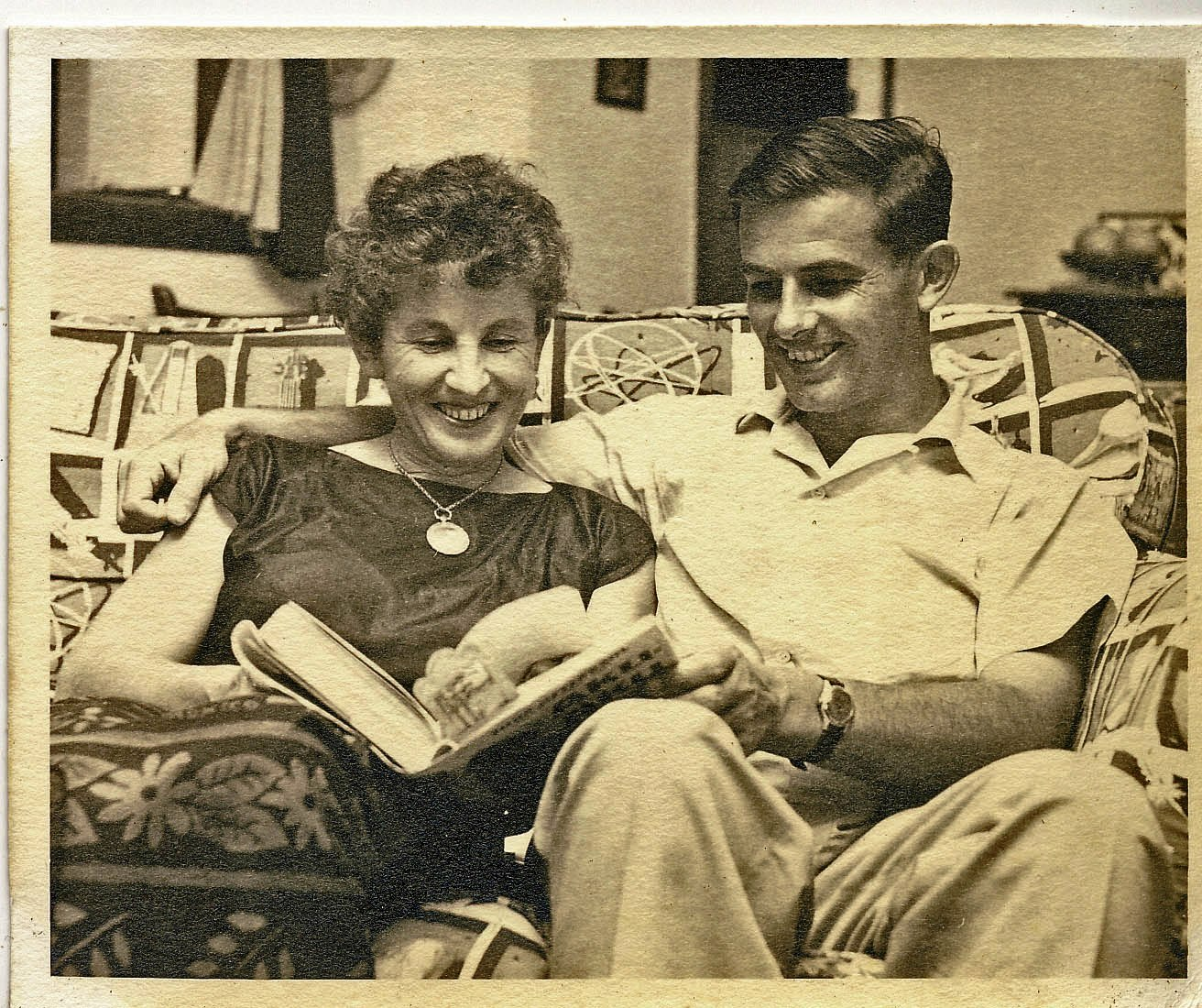
- Barbara & David Snow. At the home of Dr William Beebe, Simla, Trinidad, c. 1959.
- Born: 1921
- Died: 2007 (aged 85–86)
- Occupations: Ornithologist, Geologist
- Spouse: David Snow (ornithologist)

Barbara Kathleen Snow (nee Whitaker, b. 21 February 1921 in Evershot, Dorset, d. 2007), was an English ornithologist and geologist. Barbara and her husband David Snow formed a close team, becoming among the most influential British ornithologists of the 20th century.

== Career ==
Snow served in the ATS (women's army) for 6 years, and was promoted to the rank of Sergeant.

Following the army, Snow studied horticulture and geology at the University of Reading.

=== Warden of Lundy Island ===
Snow was Warden of Lundy Island in the Bristol Channel between 1954 and 1957.

=== New York Zoological Society in Trinidad ===
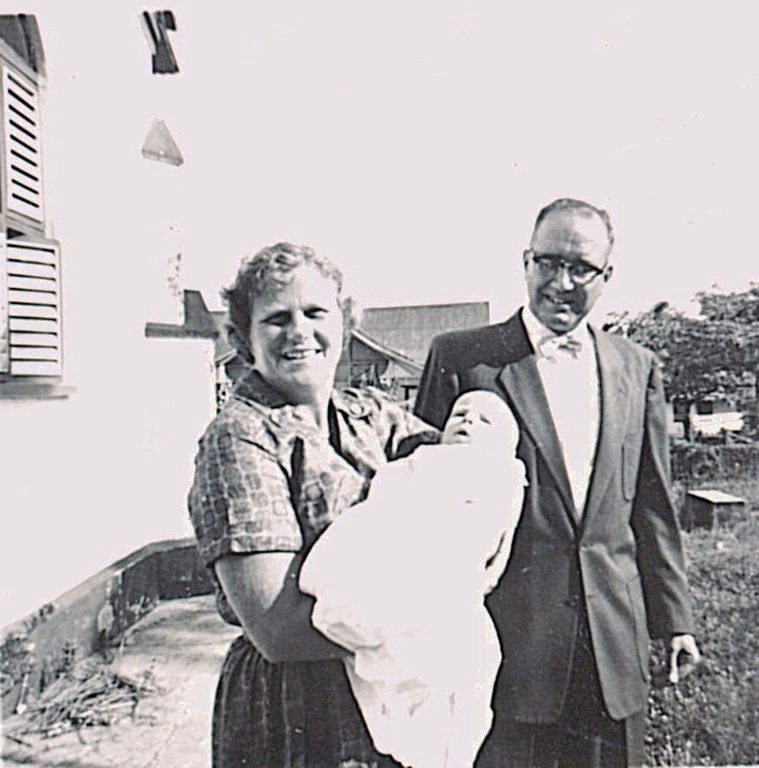
Dr Wilbur Downs and wife "Babbie" with baby of Barbara & David Snow. Trinidad c. 1961

From 1957 to 1961 the Snow and her husband, David, worked for the New York Zoological Society at the society's Tropical Research Centre headed by the famous American naturalist, William Beebe. The centre was later expanded and is now known as the research centre in Trinidad.

David Snow began his studies of the oilbirds (Steatornis caripensis), and their echolocation abilities which enabled them to navigate to their nests in complete darkness using high-pitched clicks audible to humans (unlike the echolocation sounds of many bats). Barbara joined David in 1957 and from then on they worked together as a close-knit partnership. They began detailed studies of three bird families, the hummingbirds, the cotingas and the manakins, all associated with plants. This work extended over many years in Central and South America and led to important discoveries on the co-adaption between the birds and plants, providing food for the birds while ensuring the fertilising of the plants' flowers and dispersal of their seeds - "an early breakthrough in the integration of behaviour and ecology."

The snows focussed for some time on the complex courtship dances of the white-bearded manakin (Manacus manacus) and the golden-headed manakin (Pipra erythrocephala). They hypothesised that because tropical fruit-eating birds have abundant food resources, they have leisure time which facilitated the unusual flourishing of communal mating displays, known as lek, by male manakins. David Snow described these in several classic papers, while also working with Barbara on other tropical birds.

=== British wildlife ===
The Snows continued to study birds upon their return to England - particularly of fruit-eating birds - resulting in the book Birds and Berries. David noted that "Barbara was deservedly the senior author as she had done a good deal more of the field work than I had [...] her remarkably acute observation, coupled with endless patience and, perhaps more importantly, delight in the birds around her, from Flightless Cormorants to hummingbirds, enabled her to discover much that could only be discovered by sitting and watching."

== Awards ==
In 1972, Barbara and David Snow were joint recipients of the American Ornithologists' Union's Brewster Medal.

== Personal life ==
In 1958, Snow married the British ornithologist David William Snow, in Trinidad.

In 1963, the Snows moved to the Galápagos Islands, as David was invited to become director of the new Charles Darwin Research Station there. Barbara returned to England to give birth to their second son, and in 1964 David also left the island.

Snow died in 2007. She was survived by David who died in 2009. They were survived by their two sons.

== Works ==
- Snow, D.W. & Snow, B.K. (1966). "The breeding season of the Madeiran Storm-petrel (Oceanodromo castro) in the Galapagos." Ibis 108(2):283-284.
- Snow, D.W. & Snow, B.K. (1967). "The breeding cycle of the Swallow-tailed Gull (Creagrus furcatus)." Ibis 109(1):14-24
- Snow, B.K. & Snow, D.W. (1968). "Behavior of the Swallow-tailed Gull of the Galapagos." Condor 70(3):
- Snow, B.K. & Snow, D.W. (1969). "Observations on the Lava Gull (Larus fuliginosus)." Ibis 111(1):30-35
- Snow, B.K. & Snow, D.W. (1971). "The feeding ecology of tanagers and honeycreepers in Trinidad." The Auk 88(2)
- Snow, B.K. & Snow, D.W. (1974). "Breeding of the Green-bellied Hummingbird." The Auk 91(3)
- Snow, B.K. & Snow, D.W. (1979). "The Ochre-bellied Flycatcher and the Evolution of Lek Behavior." Condor 81(3)
- Snow, B.K. & Snow, D.W. (1984). "Long-term defence of fruit by Mistle Thrushes Turdus viscivorus. Ibis 126(1):39-49
- Snow, B.K. & Snow, D.W. (1985). "Display and related behavior of male Pin-tailed Manakins." Wilson Bulletin 97(3):
- Snow, D.W. (1987). The Blackbird, Shire Natural History ISBN 0-85263-854-X
- Snow, B.K. & Snow, D.W. (1988). Birds and berries: a study of an ecological interaction. Poyser, London ISBN 0-85661-049-6
