= Greg Downs (writer) =

American author and historian (born 1971)

- Born: November 22, 1971; San Francisco, California
- Education: BA, Yale University; PhD, University of Pennsylvania
- Occupations: Author; historian
- Writing career
- Years active: 2006–present
- Genres: fiction; history
- Notable work: Spit Baths (2006)

Greg Downs (born November 22, 1971) is an author and historian. He is best known for the Flannery O'Connor Award-winning short story collection Spit Baths (2006) and his histories of the United States Civil War.

== Early life and education ==
Downs was born in San Francisco and raised in Elizabethtown and Hyden, Kentucky; Nashville; and Kapaa, Kauaʻi, Hawaii. He is the grandson of virologist and naturalist Wilbur G. Downs.

He is a B.A. graduate of Yale University, where his advisor was Melvin Patrick Ely. He graduated from the University of Iowa Writers' Workshop, which awarded him a James Michener/Copernicus Society of America fellowship.

Downs has a Ph.D. from the University of Pennsylvania.

== Career ==
=== Fiction ===
Downs' collection of short stories, Spit Baths, was published in 2006 by University of Georgia Press. It won a Flannery O'Connor Award for Short Fiction.

The book received largely positive reviews. A Publishers Weekly review of Spit Baths reads, "A strong sense of style and unfaltering command of his material allow Downs to take the kinds of risks in tone and subject that make his debut a love-it-or-hate-it proposition". Kirkus Reviews said, "perhaps the most ambitious and compelling story here is 'Ain’t I a King, Too?,' and called Downs "a writer to watch".

SFGate wrote, "Downs is gifted at presenting the tension that accompanies familial love -- be it the bafflement those tied by blood feel at the depth of their attachment, or the anxiety those bound by choice feel when realizing affection alone may not hold them together. His historical scope serves to enliven, not obscure, this uncertainty".

Martha Woodall of The Philadelphia Inquirer wrote that Spit Baths was a "rich and mesmerizing collection of short fiction". Chris Collins of The Lexington Herald-Ledger wrote that it was "one of the most entertaining books of short stories in a long time".

=== History ===
Downs studies 19th-century American political culture. He is an associate professor at the University of California, Davis.

Downs has edited and written several books about Civil War and Reconstruction-era United States history. He has also written for publications such as The American Historical Review, San Francisco Chronicle, The Atlantic and The Washington Post.

In 2015, Downs and Scott Nesbit released the Mapping Occupation project, which explores the occupation of the Reconstruction south by the United States Army. Ian Binnington in a review in Journal of American History called it "expertly presented and packed with information".

==== Declarations of Dependence: Long Reconstruction of Popular Politics in the South, 1861–1908 ====
Downs' book Declarations of Dependence: Long Reconstruction of Popular Politics in the South, 1861–1908 was published by Harvard University Press in 2015. Omar H. Ali wrote in The American Historical Review, "Gregory P. Downs offers a bold reappraisal of how Americans in the South attempted to navigate the various political and economic challenges they faced from the Civil War through the turn of the century" and that Downs' argument was "compelling"; he praised Downs' "blurring the lines between rights that are inherent to one's free status and special favors based on one's dependency".

Joe A. Mobley in The North Carolina Historical Review wrote, "Gregory P. Downs takes an interesting and unique approach to interpreting North Carolina's history from the Civil War to the early twentieth century".

==== After Appomattox: Military Occupation and the Ends of War ====
Downs' 2015 history book, After Appomattox: Military Occupation and the Ends of War, was reviewed by Fergus Bordewich of The Wall Street Journal as follows: "Mr. Downs rightly regards the appalling white-on-black violence of the late 1860s and early 1870s as systemic terrorism. Unfortunately, he lacks the human touch and eye for color that could bring alive the visceral dimension of the terrorist violence wrought upon the freed blacks".

Robert S. Davis of The New York Journal of Books wrote: "Seemingly every page of this work teaches something new and important about this period, such as the history of Tunis Campbell and his near independent black state in Georgia, and Lincoln's four shadow state governments".

== Works ==
- Spit Baths. University of Georgia Press, 2006. ISBN 0820328464
- Declarations of Dependence: Long Reconstruction of Popular Politics in the South, 1861–1908. University of North Carolina Press, 2011. ISBN 1496201922
- After Slavery: After Slavery: Race, Labor, and citizenship in the Reconstruction South, edited by Bruce E. Baker and Brian Kelly. Contributor: "Anarchy at the circumference: statelessness and the reconstruction of authority in emancipation North Carolina." University Press of Florida, 2013. ISBN 0813060974
- (Editor, with Kate Masur) The World the Civil War Made. University of North Carolina Press, 2015. ISBN 0674743989
- After Appomattox: Military Occupation and the Ends of War. Harvard University Press, 2015. ISBN 0674426169
- The Second American Revolution: The Civil War-Era Struggle Over Cuba and the Rebirth of the American Republic. University of North Carolina Press, 2019. ISBN 1469652730
