= Black populism =

Political movement in the United States

Black populism was a broad-based, independent political movement started by Black Americans following the end of the Reconstruction era. The movement began among Black agricultural workers as a response to Jim Crow laws. They sought better pay and labor protections, increased funding for Black schools, criminal justice reform, and increased participation of Black Americans in politics.

== Beginnings ==
Between 1886 and 1898 black farmers, sharecroppers, and agrarian laborers organized their communities to combat the rising tide of Jim Crow laws. As Black Populism asserted itself and grew into a regional force, it met fierce resistance from the white planter and business elite that, through the Democratic Party and its affiliated network of courts, militias, sheriffs, and newspapers, maintained tight control of the region. Violence against black Populism was organized through the Ku Klux Klan, among other white terrorist organizations designed to halt or reverse the advance of black civil and political rights.

== Goals ==
Despite opposition, black Populists carried out a wide range of activities:

- Establishing farming exchanges
- Raising money for schools
- Publishing newspapers
- Lobbying for better legislation
- Mounting boycotts against agricultural trusts
- Carrying out strikes for better wages
- Protesting the convict-lease system and lynching
- Demanding Black jurors in cases involving black defendants
- Promoting local political reforms and federal supervision of elections
- Running independent and fusion campaigns.

Black Populism found early expression in various agrarian organizations, including the Colored Agricultural Wheels, the southern Knights of Labor, the Cooperative Workers of America, and the Colored Farmers' Alliance. However, facing the limitations in attempting to implement their reforms absent of engaging the electoral process, Black Populists helped to launch the People's Party and used the then left-of-center Republican Party in fusion campaigns. (Today though, after the Republican Party moved to the right, and the Democratic Party in the South was abandoned by the White Populist Dixiecrats who had opposed integration in the 1960s, most African Americans who vote cast ballots for Democratic Party candidates).

== Resistance and failure ==
By the late 1890s, propaganda campaigns warning of a “second Reconstruction” and “Negro rule,” physical intimidation, violence, and assassinations of leaders and foot soldiers led to the movement's downfall. A key figure in the attack on Black Populism was Ben Tillman, the leader of South Carolina's white farmers' movement. Southern Populists knew that they had only two possible alternatives in the fight against the ruling Bourbon Democrats. They must choose between trying to win the Negro vote or working to eliminate it entirely. Tillman and his followers in South Carolina sought the latter method. They were completely reactionary on the Negro question and stood with the Bourbons in disregarding the principles of the Fifteenth Amendment.

Elsewhere, the populists sought to win Negro votes, either through fusion with the Republican minority or through the raising of issues with a broad appeal to the Negro farmers. It was no accident that in the South the third-party movement was strongest in those states where it sought not only black votes but active black support.

The notion that African Americans had somehow betrayed populism would haunt the Georgia People's Party from the very beginning. Populists had realized the political importance of blacks. Of the state's forty thousand Republicans voters, a considerable majority were former bondsmen. If the white votes were to split, they might decide the outcome of any state election. Populists faced the dilemma of needing to find a way to court the black votes without losing the whites, while also preventing whites from supporting the "negro party." The Party decided that it must accept the risk and court the black vote. This strategy contained a degree of precedent in state politics: in the 1870s and 1880s, democrats and independents had sometimes used the same device when the white votes split. In those days many whites were willing to allow African American men the ballot, especially when it could be sometimes bought for so little.

Black populism was destroyed, marking the end of organized political resistance to the return of white supremacy in the South in the late 19th century. Nevertheless, black populism stood as the largest independent political uprising in the South since the "general strike" during the Civil War, until the modern Civil Rights Movement.

== Sources ==
- Adam, Anthony J. (2004), Black Populism in the United States: An Annotated Bibliography, Westport, CT: Praeger, ISBN 0-313-32439-5.
- Ali, Omar H. (2010), In the Lion's Mouth: Black Populism in the New South, 1886-1900, Jackson: University Press of Mississippi, ISBN 978-1-60473-778-3.
- Ali, Omar H. (2008), In the Balance of Power: Independent Black Politics and Third Party Movements in the United States, Athens: Ohio University Press, ISBN 978-0-8214-1806-2 or 978-0-8214-1807-9.
- Ali, Omar H. (July 2006), "Standing Guard at the Door of Liberty: Black Populism in South Carolina, 1886–1895", The South Carolina Historical Magazine, 107 (3): 190–203.
- Ali, Omar H. (Spring 2005), "Independent Black Voices from the late 19th century: Black Populists and the Struggle Against the Southern Democracy", Souls: A Critical Journal of Black Politics, Culture, and Society, 7 (2): 4–18, doi:10.1080/10999940390936197, S2CID 144383083.
- Ali, Omar H. (2003), Black Populism in the New South, 1886–1898, Columbia University, Ph.D. dissertation, UMI Number 3104783.
- Du Bois, W. E. B. [1935] 1992. Black Reconstruction in America, 1860–1880. New York: Atheneum. (ISBN 0-689-70820-3)
- Gaither, Gerald H. 1977. Blacks and the Populist Revolt: Ballots and Bigotry in the 'New South'. University, Alabama: University of Alabama Press. (ISBN 0-689-70820-3)
- Goodwyn, Lawrence 1976. Democratic Promise: The Populist Movement in America. New York: Oxford University Press.
- Hahn, Steven. 2003. A Nation Under Our Feet: Black Political Struggles in the Rural South from Slavery to the Great Migration. Cambridge: Harvard University Press. (ISBN 0-674-01169-4 or ISBN 0-674-01765-X)
- Kantrowitz, Stephen. 2000. Ben Tillman & the Reconstruction of White Supremacy. Chapel Hill: University of North Carolina. (ISBN 0-8078-2530-1 and ISBN 0-8078-4839-5)
- Trelease, Allen. W. 1995. White Terror: The Ku Klux Klan Conspiracy and Southern Reconstruction. Baton Rouge: Louisiana State University Press. (ISBN 0-8071-1953-9)
- Wood, Forest G. 1970. Black Scare: The Racist Response to Emancipation and Reconstruction. Berkeley: University of California Press.
