= Leptuca terpsichores =

Scientific classification
- Domain: Eukaryota
- Kingdom: Animalia
- Phylum: Arthropoda
- Class: Malacostraca
- Order: Decapoda
- Suborder: Pleocyemata
- Infraorder: Brachyura
- Family: Ocypodidae
- Subfamily: Gelasiminae
- Tribe: Minucini
- Genus: Leptuca
- Species: L. terpsichores

Binomial name
- Leptuca terpsichores (Crane, 1941)

Synonyms
- Uca terpsichores (basionym)

Species of crab

Leptuca terpsichores, commonly known as the dancing fiddler crab, is a species of fiddler crab native to the eastern Pacific coast of the Americas, from Nicaragua to Peru.

== Taxonomy ==
Previously a member of the genus Uca, the species was transferred in 2016 to the genus Leptuca when Leptuca was promoted from subgenus to genus level. At one time, the species was considered a subspecies of L. musica.

== Description ==
The adult carapace is approximately 7 mm wide. The carapace is grey in color and males may exhibit yellow dorsal markings.

=== Similar species ===
Leptuca terpsichores is smaller than L. musica. L. terpsichores has smaller tubercles on the outer manus and fewer tubercles along the anterior carapace. The gape in the major cheliped is less serrate and the gape in the minor cheliped is slightly narrower.

== Habitat ==
The species can be found on bay shores with muddy sand substrate.
