= David Snow (ornithologist) =

English ornithologist (1924–2009)

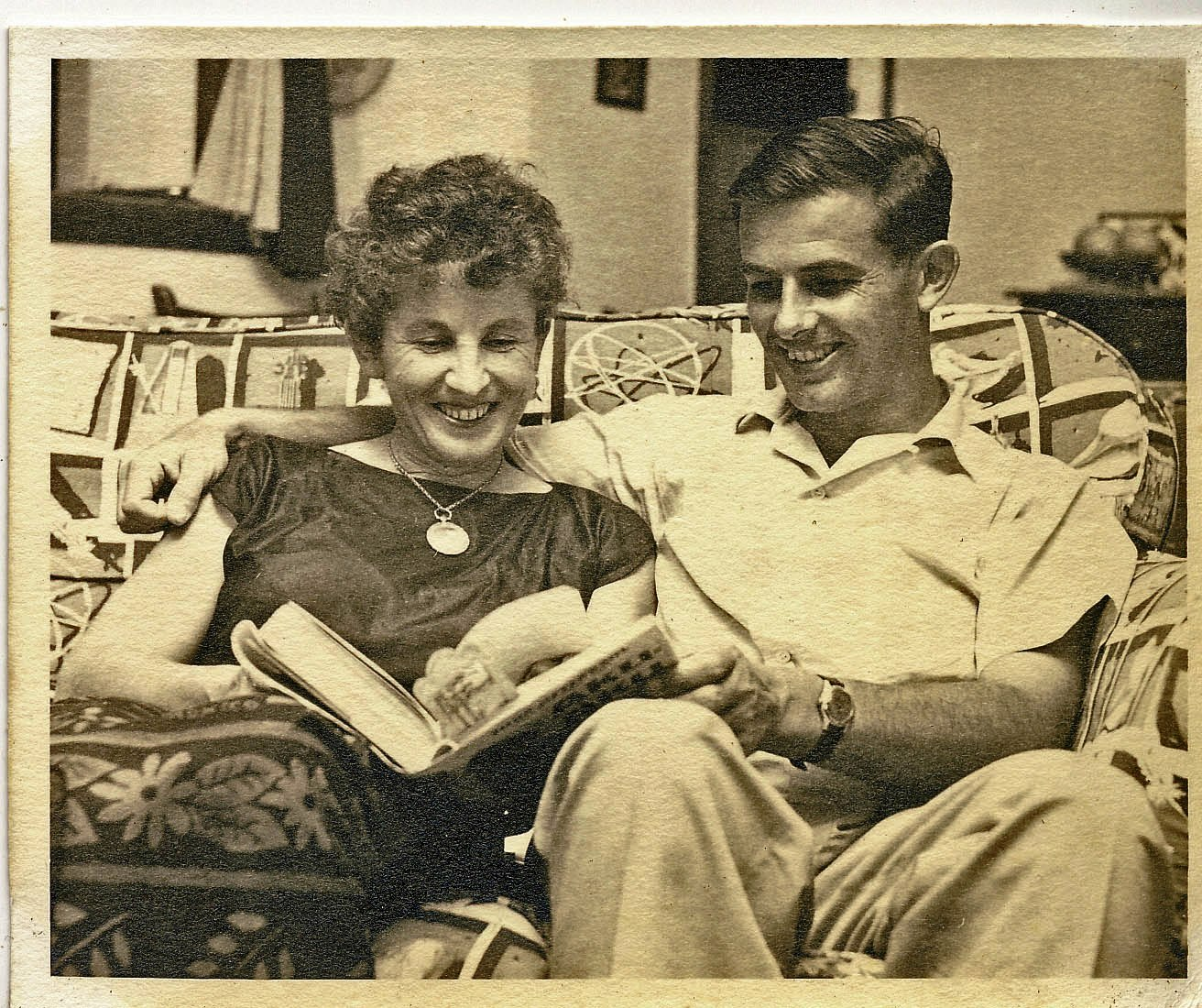
David & Barbara Snow. At the home of William Beebe, Simla, Trinidad, c. 1959.

David William Snow (30 September 1924 – 4 February 2009) was an English ornithologist born in Windermere, Westmorland.

== Career and personal life ==
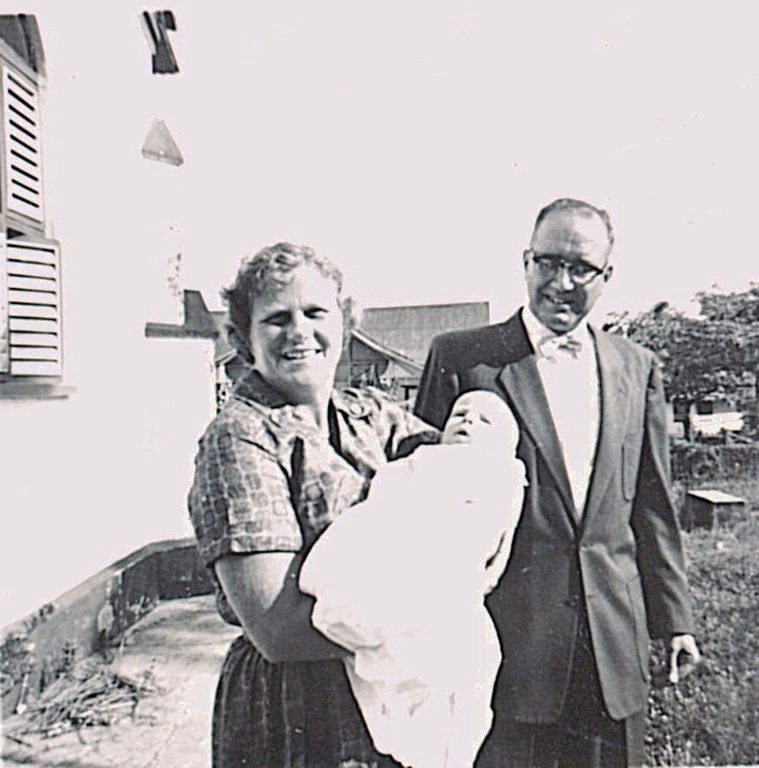
Wilbur Downs and wife "Babbie" with baby of Barbara & David Snow. Trinidad c. 1961

He won a scholarship to Eton and started there in 1938 just before his 14th birthday. He won a scholarship to study classics at New College, Oxford but was called up to serve in the navy in April 1943 and served on several ships including destroyers, frigates, and sloops. After the end of World War II, he spent a year sailing through the Far East and to Australia. In 1946 he returned to Oxford and switched from classics to the study of zoology, earning a D.Phil degree in 1953.

In 1958, David married Barbara Kathleen Whitaker, who was the warden of Lundy Island. Barbara Snow was also a noted ornithologist and a geologist. From 1957 to 1961 the Snows worked for the New York Zoological Society at the society's research centre in Trinidad. Here they made detailed studies of the oilbirds (Steatornis caripensis) and the fascinating and very complex courtship dances of the white-bearded manakin (Manacus manacus) and the golden-headed manakin (Pipra erythrocephala).

From 1963 to 1964 he was the Director of the Charles Darwin Research Station (CDRS) in the Galapagos Islands. He was Director of CDRS during the landmark expedition mounted from the University of California at Berkeley called the Galápagos International Scientific Project (GISP). He was also Director of Research for the British Trust for Ornithology from 1964 to 1968. Snow gave the 1977 Witherby Memorial Lecture on the subject of 'The relationships between the African and European avifaunas'. From 1968 to 1984 he worked at the Natural History Museum. From 1987 to 1990 he was president of the British Ornithologists' Union.

David Snow edited The Ibis, Bird Study and the Bulletin of the British Ornithologists' Club.

Snow is commemorated in the name of the cotinga genus Snowornis and the critically endangered Alagoas antwren (Myrmotherula snowi).

"With his wife, Barbara, Snow made a huge contribution to our understanding of the evolutionary consequences of fruit-eating in birds. In a series of studies of tropical birds, he theorised that the colourful plumage and elaborate mating rituals of male manakins and similar species derived from the fact that copious supplies of fruit enabled the birds to secure adequate daily calories with only a small percentage of their time devoted to feeding. This left them plenty of opportunity to develop elaborate rituals to impress the dowdier females. In England, the Snows spent five years carrying out systematic observations of fruit-eating birds in a small area on the Hertfordshire-Buckinghamshire borders, publishing their results in the seminal Birds and Berries (1988)."

Following Barbara's death in 2007, he published Birds in Our Life, an account of their lives and their close ornithological partnership.

Snow died at age 84 and is survived by two sons.

== Awards ==
In 1972 David and his wife Barbara were joint recipients of the American Ornithologists' Union's Brewster Medal.

He was elected president of the British Ornithologists' Union and in 1982 was awarded its Godman-Salvin Medal for outstanding contributions to ornithology.

== Works ==
- Snow, D.W. (1953). "The migration of the Greenland Wheatear." Ibis 95(2):376–378
- Snow, D.W. (1958). "The breeding of the Blackbird Turdus merula at Oxford." Ibis 100(1):1-30
- Snow, D.W. (1958). A Study of Blackbirds. George Allen and Unwin, London. ASIN B0000CK4EK
- Snow, D.W. (1961). "The displays of the manakins Pipra pipra and Tyranneutes virescens." Ibis 103A(1):110–113
- Snow, D.W. (1961). "The Natural History of the Oilbird,Steatornis caripensis, in Trinidad, W.I. Part 1. General Behaviour and Breeding Habits." Zoologica, Scientific Contributions of the New York Zoological Society 46(3):27–48
- Snow, D.W. (1962). "The Natural History of the Oilbird,Steatornis caripensis, in Trinidad, W.I. Part 2. Population, Breeding Ecology and Food." Zoologica, Scientific Contributions of the New York Zoological Society 47(16):199–221
- Snow, D.W. (1963). "The display of the Orange-headed manakin." Condor 65(1)
- Snow, D.W. & Snow, B.K. (1963). "Breeding and the annual cycle in three Trinidad thrushes." Wilson Bulletin 75(1)
- Snow, D.W. & Snow, B.K. (1964). Breeding seasons and annual cycles of Trinidad Land-Birds. [Paperback]
- Snow, D.W. (1965). "The breeding of the Red-billed Tropicbird in the Galapagos Islands." Condor 67(3)
- Snow, D.W. (1965). "The breeding of the Audubon's Shearwater Puffinus lherminieri in the Galapagos." The Auk 82(4)
- Snow, D.W. (1966). '"Annual cycle of the Yellow Warbler in the Galapagos." J. Field Ornithology 37(1)
- Snow, D.W. & Snow, B.K. (1966). "The breeding season of the Madeiran Storm-petrel (Oceanodromo castro) in the Galapagos." Ibis 108(2):283–284
- Snow, D.W. & Snow, B.K. (1967). "The breeding cycle of the Swallow-tailed Gull (Creagrus furcatus)." Ibis 109(1):14–24
- Snow, B.K. & Snow, D.W. (1968). "Behavior of the Swallow-tailed Gull of the Galapagos." Condor 70(3):
- Snow, B.K. & Snow, D.W. (1969). "Observations on the Lava Gull (Larus fuliginosus). Ibis 111(1):30–35
- Snow, B.K. & Snow, D.W. (1971). "The feeding ecology of tanagers and honeycreepers in Trinidad." The Auk 88(2)
- Snow, D.W. (1971). "Display of the Pompadour Cotinga Xipholena punicea." Ibis 113(1):102–104
- Snow, D.W. (1971). "Evolutionary aspects of fruit-eating by birds." Ibis 113(2):194–202
- Snow, D.W. (1971). "Social organization of the Blue-backed Manakin." Wilson Bulletin 83(1)
- Snow, D.W. & Goodwin, D. (1974). "The Black-and-gold Cotinga." The Auk 91(2)
- Snow, B.K. & Snow, D.W. (1974). "Breeding of the Green-bellied Hummingbird." The Auk 91(3)
- Snow, D.W. (1976). "The relationship between climate and annual cycles in the cotingidae." Ibis 118(3):366–401
- Snow, D.W. (1976). "The web of adaptation: bird studies in the American tropics." Collins, London ISBN 0-00-219735-9
- Snow, D.W. (co-editor) (1978–1997). Handbook of the Birds of the Western Palearctic. Edited Stanley Cramp et al.; Oxford University Press) (HBWP) (Widely known as the BWP).
- Snow, D.W. ed. (1978). An Atlas of Speciation in African Non-Passerine Birds. British Museum Press. ISBN 978-0-565-00787-4.
- Snow, B.K. & Snow, D.W. (1979). "The Ochre-bellied Flycatcher and the Evolution of Lek Behavior." Condor 81(3)
- Snow, D.W. (1982). The Cotingas: Bellbirds, Umbrella birds and their allies. British Museum Press. ISBN 0-19-858511-X
- Snow, B.K. & Snow, D.W. (1984). "Long-term defence of fruit by Mistle Thrushes Turdus viscivorus." Ibis 126(1):39–49
- Snow, B.K. & Snow, D.W. (1985). "Display and related behavior of male Pin-tailed Manakins." Wilson Bulletin 97(3):
- Snow, D.W. (1987) The Blackbird. Shire Natural History. ISBN 0-85263-854-X.
- Snow, B.K. & Snow, D.W. (1988). Birds and berries: a study of an ecological interaction. Poyser, London. ISBN 0-85661-049-6.
- Snow, D.W. ed. (1992) Birds, Discovery and Conservation: 100 years of the British Ornithologists' Club (editor), Helm Information ISBN 1-873403-15-1
- Willis, E.O.; Snow, D.W.; Stotz, D.F. & Parker III, T.A. (1993) Olive-sided Flycatchers in Southeastern Brazil Wilson Bulletin 105(1):
- Snow, D.W. et al. (1998).The Birds of the Western Palearctic: 2 Volume Set: Volume 1, Non-Passerines; Volume 2, Passerines [Abridged, Box set] [Hardcover]. Oxford University Press, US; Concise edition. ISBN 978-0-19-854099-1.
- Snow, D.W. (editor) and Stanley Cramp (author). The Complete Birds of the Western Palearctic. [Hardcover]. Oxford University Press (Sd.). Cdr edition. ISBN 978-0-19-268579-7.
- Prum, Richard O. & Snow, David W. (2003) Manakins in Perrins, Christopher The Firefly Encyclopedia of Birds. Firefly Books. pp. 434–437. ISBN 1-55297-777-3.
- Snow, D.W. (2008a) Obituary – Snow, B.K. Ibis 150(3):662–663.
- Snow, D.W. (2008b). Birds in Our Life. William Sessions Limited. ISBN 978-1-85072-381-3 (pbk). An autobiography.
