= Dunston Cave =

Cave in Trinidad and Tobago

Dunston Cave is an igneous cave on the Northern Range of Trinidad and Tobago. The cave is located on the grounds of the Asa Wright Nature Centre. Originally named Guacharo Cave, it was renamed Dunston Cave in 1972 in honour of engineer John Dunston. The caves are home to an Oilbird colony. These are the only nocturnal fruit eating birds in the world. They forage at night, navigating by echolocation in the same way as the bats.
