= Donald Griffin =

American zoologist (1915–2003)

- Born: Donald Redfield Griffin; August 3, 1915; Southampton, New York
- Died: November 7, 2003 (aged 88); Lexington, Massachusetts
- Education: Harvard University
- Known for: Animal echolocation, animal consciousness
- Spouse: Jocelyn Crane (m. 1965; died 1998)
- Awards: Daniel Giraud Elliot Medal (1958)
- Scientific career
- Fields: Zoology

Donald Redfield Griffin (August 3, 1915 – November 7, 2003) was an American professor of zoology at various universities who conducted seminal research in animal behavior, animal navigation, acoustic orientation and sensory biophysics. In 1938, while an undergraduate at Harvard University, he began studying the navigational method of bats, which he identified as animal echolocation in 1944. In The Question of Animal Awareness (1976), he argued that animals are conscious like humans. Griffin was the originator of the concept of mentophobia: the denial of the consciousness of other animals by scientists.

== Biography ==
Griffin was born on August 3, 1915, in Southampton, New York, and attended Harvard University, where he was awarded bachelor's, master's and doctoral degrees. After serving on the faculty of Cornell University he became a professor at his alma mater and later worked at Rockefeller University.

While at Harvard in the late 1930s, Griffin worked with Robert Galambos on studies of animal echolocation. Griffin conducted preliminary tests during the summer of 1939 when he was a research fellow at the Edmund Niles Huyck Preserve and Biological Research Station in Rensselaerville, New York. He set up a minimal bat flight facility in a room measuring 9 by 7 feet (2.7 by 2.1 m) in a barn and then measured the ability of bats to avoid obstacles by having them fly through a barrier of metal wires suspended from a ceiling.

The remaining work was done at Harvard's Physical Laboratories. Using sound capture technology that had been developed by physicist G. W. Pierce, Galambos and Pierce were able to determine that bats generate and hear sounds an octave higher than can be heard by humans and other animals. Experiments they conducted used methods developed by Hallowell Davis to monitor the brains of bats and their hearing responses as they navigated their way past wires suspended from a laboratory ceiling. They showed how bats used echolocation to accurately avoid obstacles, which they were unable to do if their mouths or ears were kept shut. Griffin coined the term "echolocation" in 1944 to describe the phenomenon, which many physiologists of the day could not believe was possible. During World War II, Griffin worked for National Defense Research Committee, where he supported the approval of the bat bomb.

At a time when animal thinking was a topic deemed unfit for serious research, Griffin became a pioneer in the field of cognitive ethology, starting research in 1978 that studied how animals think. His observations of the sophisticated abilities of animals to gather food and interact with their environment and each other led him to conclude that animals were conscious, thinking beings, not the mere automatons that had been postulated. In its obituary, The New York Times credited Griffin as "the only reason that animal thinking was given consideration at all". While critics argue that cognitive ethology is anthropomorphic and subjective, those in the field have studied the ways that animals form concepts and mental states based on their interactions with their environment, showing how animals base their actions and anticipate the responses of other sentient beings. He was elected a Fellow of the American Academy of Arts and Sciences in 1952. In 1958 he was awarded the Daniel Giraud Elliot Medal from the National Academy of Sciences. He was elected to the American Philosophical Society in 1971.

He was a member of the National Academy of Sciences.

Griffin was the Director of the Institute for Research in Animal Behavior, in the 1960s, which was formed as a collaboration between Rockefeller University and the New York Zoological Society (now Wildlife Conservation Society). In 1965 following on from research on bats conducted at the New York Zoological Society's field station in Trinidad and Tobago, he married Jocelyn Crane.

A resident of Lexington, Massachusetts, since his 1986 departure from Rockefeller University, Griffin died at his home there at age 88 on November 7, 2003. He was survived by two daughters and a son from his first marriage.

== Publications ==
- Listening in the Dark (1958)
- Echoes of Bats and Men (1959) Anchor Books (Doubleday). LCCN 59--12051
- Animal Structure and Function (1962) Holt, Rinehart and Winston
- Bird Migration: The Biology and Physics of Orientation Behaviour (1965) London: Heinemann
- Animal Structure and Function (1970, 2nd ed. co-authored with Alvin Novick) Holt, Rinehart and Winston
- Question of Animal Awareness (1976) ISBN 0-86576-002-0
- Animal Thinking (1985) Harvard University Press. ISBN 0-674-03713-8
- Animal Minds (1992)
- Animal Minds: Beyond Cognition to Consciousness (2001) ISBN 0-226-30865-0
- "Windows on nonhuman minds," in Michel Weber and Anderson Weekes (eds.), Process Approaches to Consciousness in Psychology, Neuroscience, and Philosophy of Mind (Whitehead Psychology Nexus Studies II), Albany, New York, State University of New York Press, 2009, pp. 219 sq. [This is one of the last publications of D. R. Griffin, received in March 2002.]
