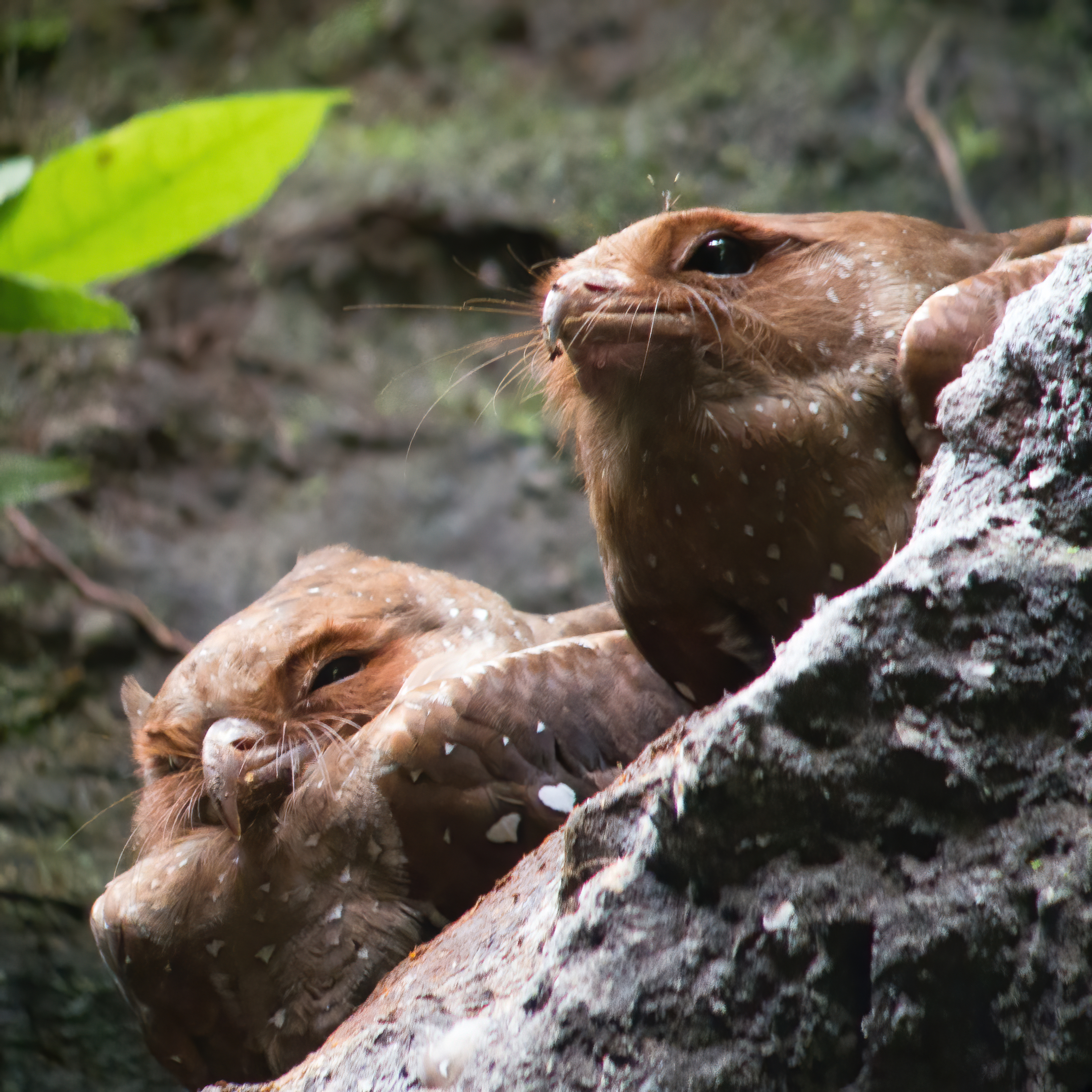
- Oilbirds (Steatornis caripensis)

Scientific classification
- Kingdom: Animalia
- Phylum: Chordata
- Class: Aves
- Clade: Vanescaves
- Order: Steatornithiformes; Mayr, 2010
- Family: Steatornithidae; Bonaparte, 1842

Genera
- †Euronyctibius; Steatornis

= Steatornithidae =

Family of birds

Steatornithidae is a family of birds comprising a single extant species, the oilbird (Steatornis caripensis) and the extinct genus Euronyctibius.

Steatornithidae is currently considered the only member of the order Steatornithiformes, however, in the past, it was classified in the order Caprimulgiformes, along with all other members of the clade Strisores. Prior to the Hackett et al. phylogeny most taxonomies circumscribed Caprimulgiformes as a paraphyletic comprising the nocturnal strisoreans.

== Summary of extant species ==
Common name	Binomial name	Population	Status	Trend	Notes	Image
Oilbird	Steatornis caripensis	20,000-49,999	LC	Steady		
