= Sonja Buckley =

American virologist

- Photograph of Sonja Buckley, provided by the Yale University Library
- Born: Sonja Grob; June 13, 1918; Zürich, Switzerland
- Died: February 2, 2005 (aged 86); Baltimore, Maryland, United States
- Education: University of Zurich
- Known for: Culturing Lassa virus
- Spouse: John J. Buckley
- Scientific career
- Fields: Virology, cancer biology

Sonja Buckley (June 13, 1918 – February 2, 2005) was a Swiss-born virologist. She was the first person to culture Lassa virus, the causative agent of Lassa fever, a potentially deadly disease that originated in Africa.

== Biography ==
Sonja Grob was born in Zürich, Switzerland. In 1941, she married Dr. John J. Buckley, a pathologist who was also studying in Zürich.

Sonja Buckley was awarded her medical degree in 1944 from the University of Zurich, and she was later a microbiology instructor there.

With her husband, she emigrated to the United States in 1947, as both of them had already arranged to work at Johns Hopkins University in Baltimore. Her first research "assignment was to study the spread of the polio virus in East Baltimore neighborhoods".

After working as a research assistant at Johns Hopkins for a short time, she joined the Sloan-Kettering Institute in New York City where she was chosen to head the solid tumor program in 1949. In 1957, she joined the Rockefeller Foundation to work in the foundation's virus laboratories. In 1964, those labs were transferred to Yale University in New Haven, Connecticut, and became known as the Arbovirus Research Unit.

Buckley became interested in Lassa fever (Lassa mammarenavirus) after an outbreak of the unknown virus occurred in Nigeria in Africa in 1969 that was responsible for outbreaks of hemorrhagic fever. Specimens were sent to four different laboratories, including the Arbovirus Research Unit, where virologists attempted to isolate the causative agent, but Buckley was the first to do so, working with her team, which included Wilbur Downs and Jordi Casals-Ariet,

Sonja Buckley retired from Yale in 1994, and died on February 2, 2005, at the age of 86. A daughter, Sonja Mary Buckley, died as a young child in 1943, and her husband died in 1987.

== Selected publications ==
- Buckley, Sonja M., Elinor Whitney, and Fred Rapp. "Identification by fluorescent antibody of developmental forms of psittacosis virus in tissue culture." Proceedings of the Society for Experimental Biology and Medicine 90.1 (1955): 226-230.
- Buckley, Sonja M. "Propagation, Cytopathogenicity, and Hemagglutination-Hemadsorption of Some Arthropodborne Viruses in Tissue Culture." NYASA 81.1 (1959): 172-187.
- Buckley, Sonja M. "Susceptibility of the Aedes albopictus and A. aegypti cell lines to infection with arboviruses." Proceedings of the Society for Experimental Biology and Medicine 131.2 (1969): 625-630.
- Buckley, Sonja M., and Jordi Casals. "Lassa fever, a new virus disease of man from West Africa." The American journal of tropical medicine and hygiene 19.4 (1970): 680-691.
- Buckley, Sonja M., Jordi Casals, and Wilbur G. Downs. "Isolation and antigenic characterization of Lassa virus." Nature 227.5254 (1970): 174-174.
- Cunningham, Ann, et al. "Isolation of chikungunya virus contaminating an Aedes albopictus cell line." Journal of General Virology 27.1 (1975): 97-100.
- Buckley, Sonja M. "Arbovirus infection of vertebrate and insect cell cultures, with special emphasis on Mokola, Obodhiang, and kotonkan viruses of the rabies serogroup." Annals of the New York Academy of Sciences 266 (1975): 241-250.
