= Wilbur Downs =

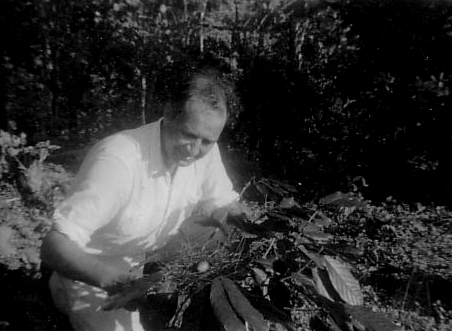
Downs holding first identified bearded bellbird nest and egg, Cumaca, Trinidad, 1950s

Wilbur George Downs (7 August 1913 – 17 February 1991) was a naturalist, virologist and clinical professor of epidemiology and public health at the Yale School of Medicine and the Yale School of Public Health.

== Career ==
Downs was born in Perth Amboy, New Jersey. He graduated from Cornell Medical College in medicine in 1938 after studying tropical parasitology with Pedro Kouri at the University of Havana, Cuba. He went to Trinidad and Tobago, then in the British West Indies, in 1941 and studied malaria there until 1943 when he was inducted into the U.S. Army as a 1st Lieutenant. His epidemiological survey of malaria in Trinidad and Tobago in 1941–1943 is one of the classic works in the field.

Downs served as malaria control officer in the New Hebrides, Russell Islands and New Georgia. In 1944 he went to Bougainville and in 1945 became acting chief of preventive medicine on Okinawa, as well as spending time in Guam. He was awarded the Bronze Star and Presidential and military citations for his work with malaria and communicable tropical diseases.

By the end of World War II, he was one of the world's most experienced researchers in a wide range of tropical diseases, including malaria, venereal diseases, dengue fever, leprosy, filariasis, scrub typhus, leprosy, intestinal parasites, fungal infections, tuberculosis, and more.

Downs retired from the army as a lieutenant colonel in 1946 and was sent to Mexico by the Rockefeller Foundation to direct a malaria-control program from 1946 to 1952. While there, he set up an extensive public health and malaria investigation program, and was one of the first people to question the use of DDT and similar insecticides in the control of the disease. In 1952 the Rockefeller Foundation sent him back to Trinidad where he established the Trinidad Regional Virus Laboratory, now part of the Caribbean Epidemiology Center (Carec) in Port of Spain.

Downs kept close contact with William Beebe who, at the time, was the director of the New York Zoological Society's Tropical Research Centre at Simla in Trinidad and helped coordinate the activities of both organisations and sharing resources. He had a real interest in and supported research in many fields including entomology, ornithology, mammalogy, archaeology, epidemiology, and ecology.

In 1961 he became associate director of the Medical and Natural Sciences Division in charge of the Rockefeller Foundation's arbovirus programme. From 1963 to 1971 he became director of the Yale Arbovirus Research Unit and professor of epidemiology. In 1969 he worked on isolating the Lassa fever virus with Jordi Casals-Ariet and Sonja Buckley. He resigned from the Rockefeller Foundation in 1971 but continued at Yale as a lecturer. In 1973 he was appointed clinical professor of epidemiology. The Downs Fellowship at Yale continues his legacy by sponsoring student research in global health. Over 600 students have participated in its 50-year history.

He was the author or co-author of over 150 scientific articles and published a landmark reference work with Max Theiler, The Arthropod-Borne Viruses of Vertebrates, in 1973. In 1984 he was awarded the Walter Reed Medal from the American Society of Tropical Medicine and Hygiene.

Downs died in Branford, Connecticut.

== Private life ==
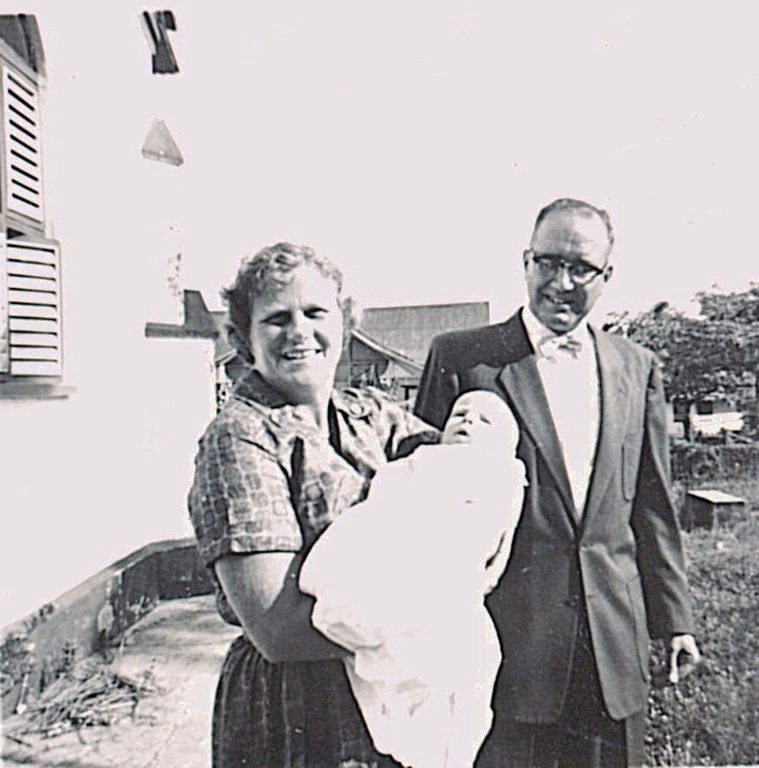
Downs and wife Babbie with baby of Barbara and David Snow in Trinidad, c. 1961

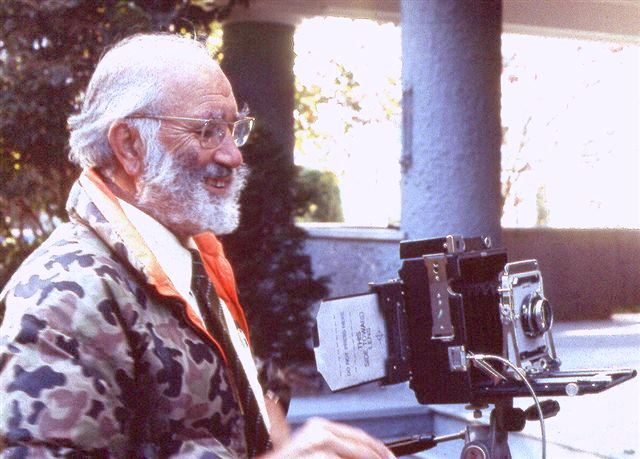
Downs with camera, 1977

Downs was an avid reader with a huge private library including works in Spanish, French, German and Russian. He had a large collection of tropical orchids and performed a number of hybridization experiments. A hybrid genus of orchids, Downsara, was named after him. He was a keen fisherman and expert marksman (once a member of the National Rifle Team of Trinidad and Tobago), an accomplished photographer, stamp collector, guitarist and bookbinder. Downs was preceded in death by his first wife Helen Hartley Geer Downs, called "Babbie" by her friends, and by their youngest daughter Martha. He was survived by his second wife Dorothy Gardner Downs and their two sons and four daughters. Downs' grandson Greg Downs is an author and historian.

== Selected works ==
- Theiler, Max and Downs, W. G. The Arthropod-Borne Viruses of Vertebrates: An Account of the Rockefeller Foundation Virus Program, 1951–1970. Yale University Press, 1973.
- Downs, Wilbur. Editor and contributor. "Virus Diseases in the West Indies". Special Edition of the Caribbean Medical Journal, vol. XXVI, nos. 1–4, 1965.
