= Jordi Casals i Ariet =

Catalan epidemiologist

- Born: 15 May 1911; Viladrau, Osona, Spain
- Died: 10 February 2004; New York
- Other name: Jordi Casals-Ariet
- Occupations: virologist and epidemiologist
- Known for: discovery of Lassa virus viral taxonomy

Jordi Casals i Ariet (born 15 May 1911, Viladrau, Osona, Spain; died 10 February 2004) was a Catalan physician and epidemiologist.

Casals' major legacies include his work on viral taxonomy, especially for insect-borne viruses, and significant improvements in safety in the handling of dangerous pathogens in laboratory settings. The latter stem in part from an incident in 1969 at Yale where Casals barely survived the Lassa fever he contracted while studying the virus in the laboratory, and another staff member, Juan Roman, died.

== Early life and education ==
Casals served in the Spanish Army before studying medicine in Barcelona, where he graduated in 1934. He remained as an intern at Hospital Clínic de Barcelona until 1936, when he emigrated to the United States during the Spanish Civil War.

== Career ==
After graduating from medical school in Barcelona, Casals moved to New York in 1936, and first worked in the Department of Pathology at Cornell University Medical College in New York. In 1938, he moved to the Rockefeller Institute of Medical Research (now Rockefeller University) in Manhattan. There he began his research on classifying viruses which later became one of his most important legacies.

In 1952, Casals joined the Rockefeller Foundation, where he worked on analysis of samples collected in the field. His collection of viral disease agents gathered during this period was the germ of the future reference collection at the World Health Organization.

In 1964, the Rockefeller Foundation moved its insect-borne disease group to Yale University, and in 1965 Casals therefore moved to New Haven and was appointed professor of epidemiology at Yale University (within the Rockefeller Foundation). In 1969 he became deathly ill while investigating Lassa virus, and barely survived; a technician fell ill several months later and died.

Casals went on to investigate the Lassa outbreaks in West Africa. In 1973, biologists in Sierra Leone, with the help of teams from Yale and the CDC, determined that the Lassa virus was being passed to humans from wild rats. Casals also continued his sample collection, collaborating with the CDC to establish what eventually became the World Health Organization's reference collection of arboviruses.

Casals left Yale in 1981 for Mount Sinai School of Medicine. and remained there until his death. His last paper was published in 1998.

Jordi Casals carried out noted studies on multiple diseases, including Lassa fever. He identified Lassa virus and a large number of other pathogens; among them, the Zika virus. Casals was a consultant for numerous health institutions and organizations, and was awarded the Kimble Methodology Award by the American Public Health Association for his scientific curriculum. He was considered a world authority in the field of viruses, especially arboviruses.

Casals collaborated with many institutions during his career, such as the WHO, the United States National Institute of Mental Health, and was elected to many U.S. and international societies. He worked with hundreds of scientists worldwide during his career, and was known for his scientific accuracy and professional ethics.

== Lassa research and incidents ==
=== Discovery ===
In January 1969, missionary nurse Laura Wine fell ill with a mysterious disease she contracted from an obstetrical patient in the Lassa Mission Hospital where she worked in Lassa, Nigeria a village in Borno State. She was then airlifted to a better-equipped hospital Jos, Nigeria where she died the next day. Subsequently, two other nurses at the Jos hospital became infected, Charlotte Shaw, who died, and fifty-two-year-old nurse Lily Pinneo, commonly known as Penny, who had cared for Wine. Pinneo was flown to New York, along with tissues from other patients and victims, and treated for nine weeks at Columbia Presbyterian Hospital, and survived. A specialist in tropical diseases at the Columbia Presbyterian provided samples from Pinneo to the Yale Arbovirus Research Unit.

While at Yale, Casals and his team studied new viruses from Africa, and he identified an unknown virus in the blood of three American nurses who had been missionaries in Nigeria, in the village of Lassa in the Borno State in the northeastern part of the country. The newly isolated virus was named after the village.

=== Incidents ===
In June 1969, three months after Lassa fever reached Yale University, Casals fell ill with a fever and cold-like symptoms, with chills and severe muscle pain. On 15 June, he was placed in an isolation unit. He had been tested for Lassa, but the results wouldn't be known for four days, and it was uncertain that he would survive that long. The decision was made for him to be inoculated with antibodies from nurse Lily Pinneo (convalescing at home in Rochester, New York), a decision researchers made according to Robert W. McCollum, chief of epidemiology. Casals recovered, and resumed his research.

In December 1969, a technician at the laboratory, Juan Roman, was admitted to a hospital in Pennsylvania where he was visiting his family, with a fever of 105 °F (41 °C) and in acute distress. Antibiotics and other courses of treatment were prescribed, but he died five days later. A blood test confirmed the presence of Lassa virus. Although he worked at the Yale Arbovirus Research Unit where researchers were investigating the Lassa virus, he did not work in the actual facility where the virus was present, and he had no known contact with the virus. After his death, forty-one hospital personnel who had been in contact with him and seven family members were put under intense surveillance for two weeks in Pennsylvania, and in Puerto Rico where he was buried, but all managed to escape the infection.

Casals confirmed that Roman had succumbed to Lassa Fever. This chilling information caused the group investigating the live virus to stop their investigation, and all samples were sent to a maximum security laboratory at the Centers for Disease Control (CDC).

== Biosafety ==
Although Casals and his coworkers recognized the dangerous nature of Lassa virus, and had implemented special safety protocols, Casals contracted Lassa fever in June 1969 nevertheless, and nearly died from it. A few months later, technician Juan Roman became ill and died, even though he never worked directly in the laboratory or dealt with the virus. It was never determined how the two of them contracted the virus, although one theory was dust kicked up by lab mice. The chilling effect of this caused the laboratory to halt work on the virus, and transfer the samples to the CDC maximum-security lab.

According to Dr. Gregory Tignor, a retired Yale professor who worked with Dr. Casals, "It took great courage to work with viruses in those days because every worker knew that his or her life was in danger." The events at the Yale laboratory had a major impact in the handling of dangerous viruses. Yale biological safety officer Ben Fontes gave credit to the "extremely careful" protocols Casals had designed for preventing a more serious outbreak, and said that "The incident forced changes to biosafety nationally, and was one of the seminal events in [bringing about modern] biosafety. Following the incidents at the Yale lab and other labs nationally, a classification system was developed to label the danger level of handling different viruses or other biological agents. As a result, pathogens like Lassa and unidentified new ones were sent to the most secure facilities.

== Viral taxonomy ==
Casals helped identify and classify a thousand viruses. Lassa is one of many he discovered. He is considered an authority on viral taxonomy because of his landmark classification of pathogenic viruses, especially mosquito- and other insect-borne viruses, among which is the Zika virus. He also was the first to establish the fact that some viruses that cause infections in the same organ, such as polio, encephalitis, or rabies viruses in the central nervous system, are not from the same family but belong to different families.

== Awards ==
- Richard M Taylor Award, given by the American Committee on Arthropod-Borne Viruses.
- Kimble Methodology Award, from the American Public Health Association.

== Personal life ==
Casals had polio as a child, and as a result walked with a limp in adulthood.

He was married to Ellen Casals.

== See also ==
- Biohazard
- Biocontainment
- Biosafety level
- Lassa fever
- Lassa virus
- Public health
- Virology

== Sources ==
- Altman, Lawrence K (21 February 2004). "Jordi Casals-Ariet, Who Found Lassa Virus, Dies at 92". The New York Times.
- Buckley, Sonja M.; Casals, Jordi; Downs, Wilbur G. (11 July 1970). "Isolation and Antigenic Characterization of Lassa Virus". Nature. 227 (5254): 174. Bibcode:1970Natur.227..174B. doi:10.1038/227174a0. PMID 5428406. S2CID 4211129.
- CDC (31 January 2019). "Lassa Fever | CDC". CDC.
- "A History of the Church of the Brethren Mission in Nigeria and the Emergence of Ekklesiyar Yan'uwa a Nigeria, part 4". Church of the Brethren.
- Donaldson, Ross I (2009). The Lassa Ward:One Man's Fight Against One of the World's Deadliest Diseases. St. Martin's Press. ISBN 978-0-312-37700-7.
- Frame, J. D.; Baldwin, J. M.; Gocke, D. J.; Troup, J. M. (1 July 1970). "Lassa fever, a new virus disease of man from West Africa. I. Clinical description and pathological findings". The American Journal of Tropical Medicine and Hygiene. 19 (4): 670–676. doi:10.4269/ajtmh.1970.19.670. ISSN 0002-9637. PMID 4246571.
- Frame, J. D. (1 May 1992). "The story of Lassa fever. Part I: Discovering the disease". New York State Journal of Medicine. 92 (5): 199–202. ISSN 0028-7628. PMID 1614671.
- Carbonell i de Ballester, Jordi; Carreras i Marti, Joan. Gran Enciclopèdia Catalana (in Catalan). Barcelona: Enciclopèdia Catalana. OCLC 225886002.
- Miquel Bruguera i Cortada (MBC) (2015). "Jordi Casals i Ariet". Galeria de metges Catalans [Gallery of Catalan Physicians]. Barcelona: Col·legi Oficial de Metges de Barcelona.
- Communicable Disease Center, Public Health Service, U.S. Dept of Health, Education, and Welfare; Atkins, John L; Freeman, Stanley (28 March 1970). "Epidemiologic Notes and Reports Lassa Virus Infection – Pennsylvania". Morbidity and Mortality Weekly Report. 19 (12). Atlanta: The Office: 123.
- Lenzer, Jeanne (17 April 2004). "Jordi Casals-Ariet". British Medical Journal. 328 (7445): 959. PMC 390228.
- Peart, Karen N. (20 February 2004). "In Memoriam: Physician-Virologist who Pioneered Study of Virus Relationship, Jordi Casals-Ariet". Yale News. Yale University.
- Prono, Luca (9 January 2008). Zhang, Yawei (ed.). Encyclopedia of Global Health. Vol. 1. SAGE. ISBN 978-1-4129-4186-0. OCLC 775277696.
- Powell, Kendall (2004). "A life among the viruses". Yale Medicine. Yale School of Medicine. Archived from the original on 10 August 2016.
- Swanson, II, Phillip A.; Dorian B., McGavern (2015). "Viral Diseases of the Central Nervous System". Curr Opin Virol. 11: 44–54. doi:10.1016/j.coviro.2014.12.009. PMC 4456224. PMID 25681709.
- "El virus zika, 'patentat' per un català el 1947" [Zika virus, 'patented' by a Catalan in 1947]. directe!cat. Generalitat Valenciana. 2 February 2016. Archived from the original on 3 January 2017.
