= Leptuca musica =

Musical fiddler crab

Scientific classification
- Domain: Eukaryota
- Kingdom: Animalia
- Phylum: Arthropoda
- Class: Malacostraca
- Order: Decapoda
- Suborder: Pleocyemata
- Infraorder: Brachyura
- Family: Ocypodidae
- Subfamily: Gelasiminae
- Genus: Leptuca
- Species: L. musica

Binomial name
- Leptuca musica (Rathbun, 1914)

Synonyms
- Uca musica (basionym)

Species of crab

Leptuca musica, commonly known as the musical fiddler crab, is a species of fiddler crab native to Baja California and the Gulf of California in Mexico.

== Taxonomy ==
Previously a member of the genus Uca, the species was transferred in 2016 to the genus Leptuca when Leptuca was promoted from subgenus to genus level. At one time, the species was considered a subspecies of the same species with L. terpsichores.

== Description ==
The adult carapace is usually around 10.5–11 mm wide and is cylindrical. The minor cheliped is small in both sexes and has a wide gape.

=== Similar species ===
L. musica is somewhat larger than L. terpsichores. The tubercles on the outer manus are larger and they are more numerous along the anterior carapace. The gape in the major cheliped is more serrate and the gape in the minor cheliped is slightly wider.
