= Asa Wright Nature Centre =

Nature restort in Trinadad and Tobago

Asa Wright Nature Centre and Lodge
- Location within Trinidad and Tobago
- Interactive map of Asa Wright Nature Centre and Lodge
- Location: Trinidad and Tobago
- Nearest city: Arima
- Coordinates: 10.717933°N 61.298267°W
- Area: 5.3 km^{2} (2.0 sq mi)
- Created: 1949
- Operator: Rapsey Estate
- Designation: Nature Resort and Scientific Research Station

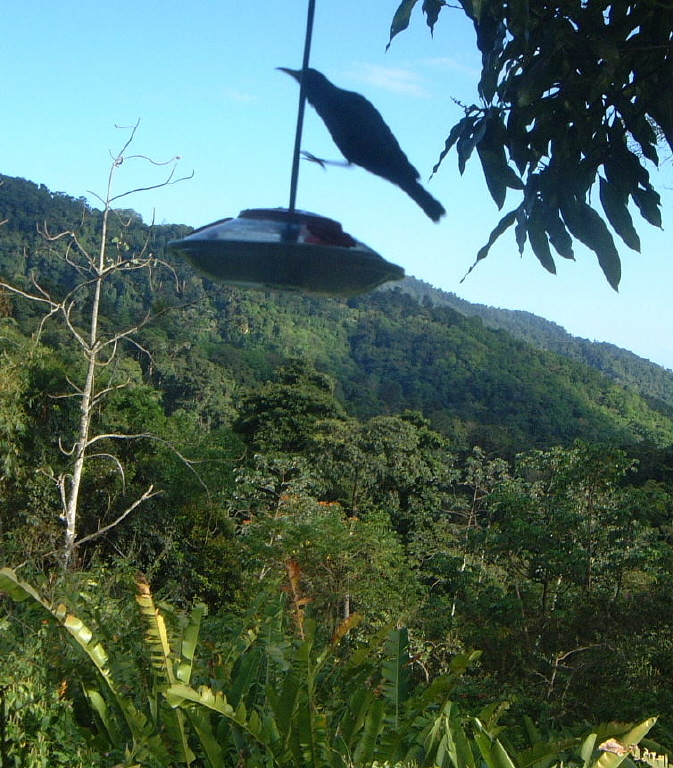
View from the lodge veranda including a bird and feeder in the foreground

The Asa Wright Nature Centre and Lodge is a nature resort and scientific research station in the Arima Valley of the Northern Range in Trinidad and Tobago. The centre is one of the top birdwatching spots in the Caribbean; a total of 256 species of birds have been recorded there. The centre is owned by a non-profit trust.

The nature centre is on 270 acres (110 ha) and includes a main estate house with inn and restaurant serving dishes such as callaloo soup with ingredients from an on-site organic garden. Non-adjacent properties have also been added to the centre's land holdings.

== Description ==
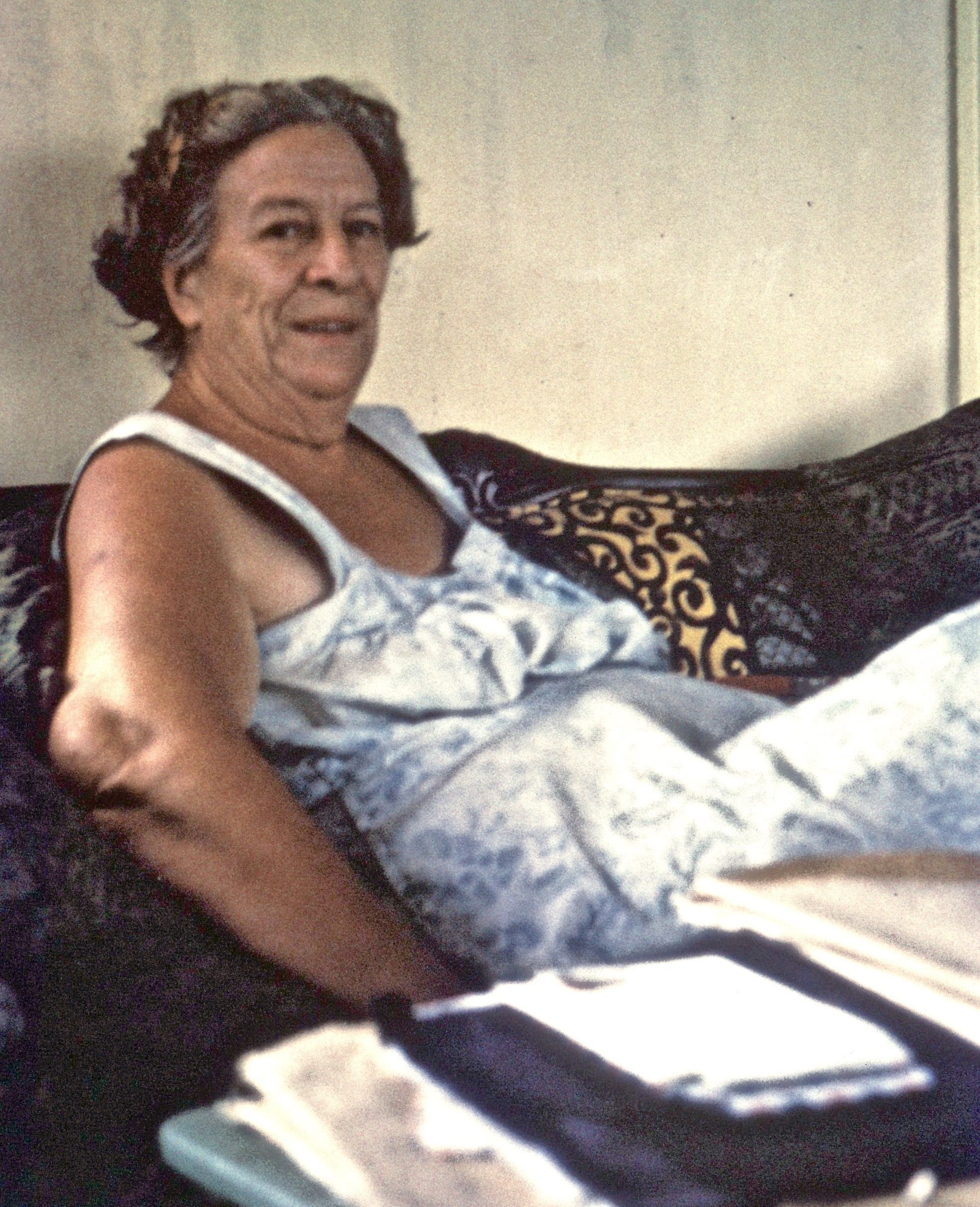
Asa Wright at home in 1967

The major properties are the Spring Hill Estate and the adjacent William Beebe Tropical Research Station (also known as Simla), which was established by the famous naturalist and explorer William Beebe as a tropical research station for the New York Zoological Society. Beebe bought the 'Verdant Vale' estate in 1949 and named it after Simla in India, which he had visited in 1910. Beebe stayed at Springhill in 1949 with the Wrights, while water and electricity connections were made to Simla, four miles down the road. His bedroom is now the Springhill manager's office.

The owners of the Spring Hill Estate, Newcombe and Asa Wright, hosted the noted ornithologists David Snow and Barbara Snow in the 1950s. They made detailed studies of the oilbirds and the Bearded bellbird. Starting in 1965, Richard ffrench and Don Eckelberry collaborated in eventually publishing A Guide to the Birds of Trinidad and Tobago.

The Wrights' home became internationally renowned for its easy access to wildlife, especially the oilbird (Steatornis caripensis) colonies in the nearby Dunston Cave. The Asa Wright Nature Center was established on 22 December 1967, with the Royal Bank Trust Company (Trinidad) Limited appointed as Trustee. The Trust was meant to protect Springhill "in perpetuity", developing its agriculture in an "ecologically sound" way while facilitating its "scientific and educational" potential. Asa was allowed to live out the remaining years of her life according to a provision in agreement. She died in 1971. In 1974, the New York Zoological Society donated Simla to the trust.

The nature centre in 2001 acquired the Rapsey Estate, known as 'El Naranjo' for TT$3,3 million. The total nature centre holdings are now over 1,300 acres, but this still makes up less than 5% of the valley.

== Springhill ==
The home was built from 1906 to 1908 on the cocoa estate originally known as Clearwater by Charles Meyer, on property bought by his father Fredrich Wilhelm Meyer in the Arima Valley. The first four of eleven children between Charles and his wife Julia Marie Pouchet were born at Springhill. The house was characterised by high ceilings, six rooms, with a hallway between the rear four, and a wide veranda overlooking the valley. However, his father's estates were confiscated in World War I by the Trinidad colonial government, since he was of German origin.

Charles' cocoa estate, already mortgaged, could no longer turn a profit when plagued by witch's broom, and was reverted to the Agricultural Bank in 1925. Andrew and Marianne Bernard bought the property in 1926, but once again the estate reverted to the bank. The estate remained neglected until purchased in 1936 by Joseph Holmes, son of Joseph Austin Holmes. Holmes added two bathrooms, a water supply, septic tank, generator, two-room guest house, and a bathing pool at the foot of the waterfall.

In the 1930s, it became a weekend retreat for Pan Am pilots, US Navy families, and government officials. After World War II, Newcome and Asa Wright bought all of the property except the ten acres containing the guest house, pool and waterfall. However, in 1955, Asa acquired that remaining acreage after Newcome's death.

== Wildlife ==
The centre is one of the most biodiverse areas in the West Indies and is home to more than 250 bird species. Bird species at the nature centre include purple honeycreeper, tufted coquette (a hummingbird), tropical mockingbird, and oilbird (a nocturnal fruit eater).

Red brocket deer, the elusive ocelot, the Brazilian porcupine and the southern tamandua have been recorded in the forests of the centre. Red-rumped agouti is another mammal that occurs at the centre and that can be often seen near the main house.

== Gallery ==
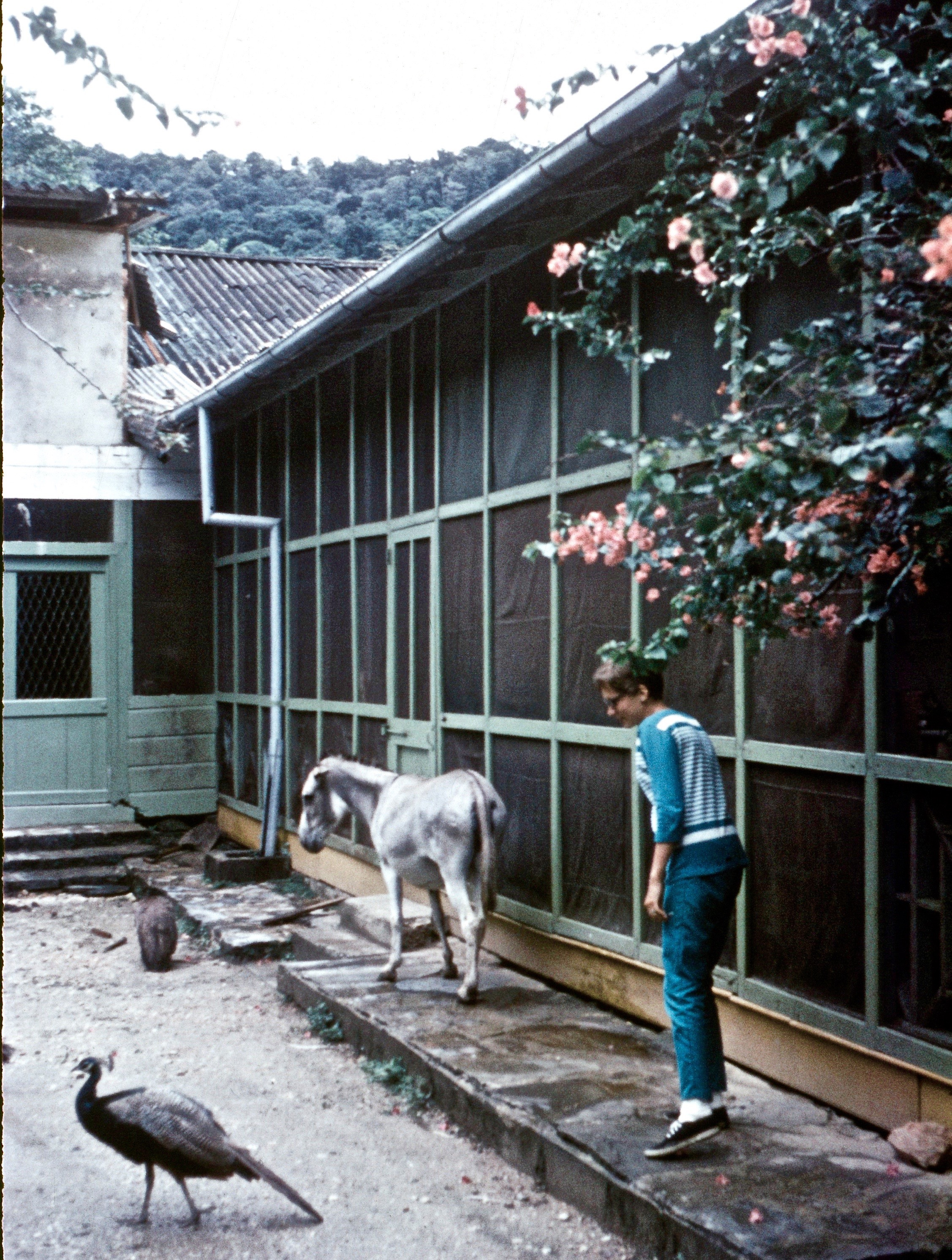
in 1967

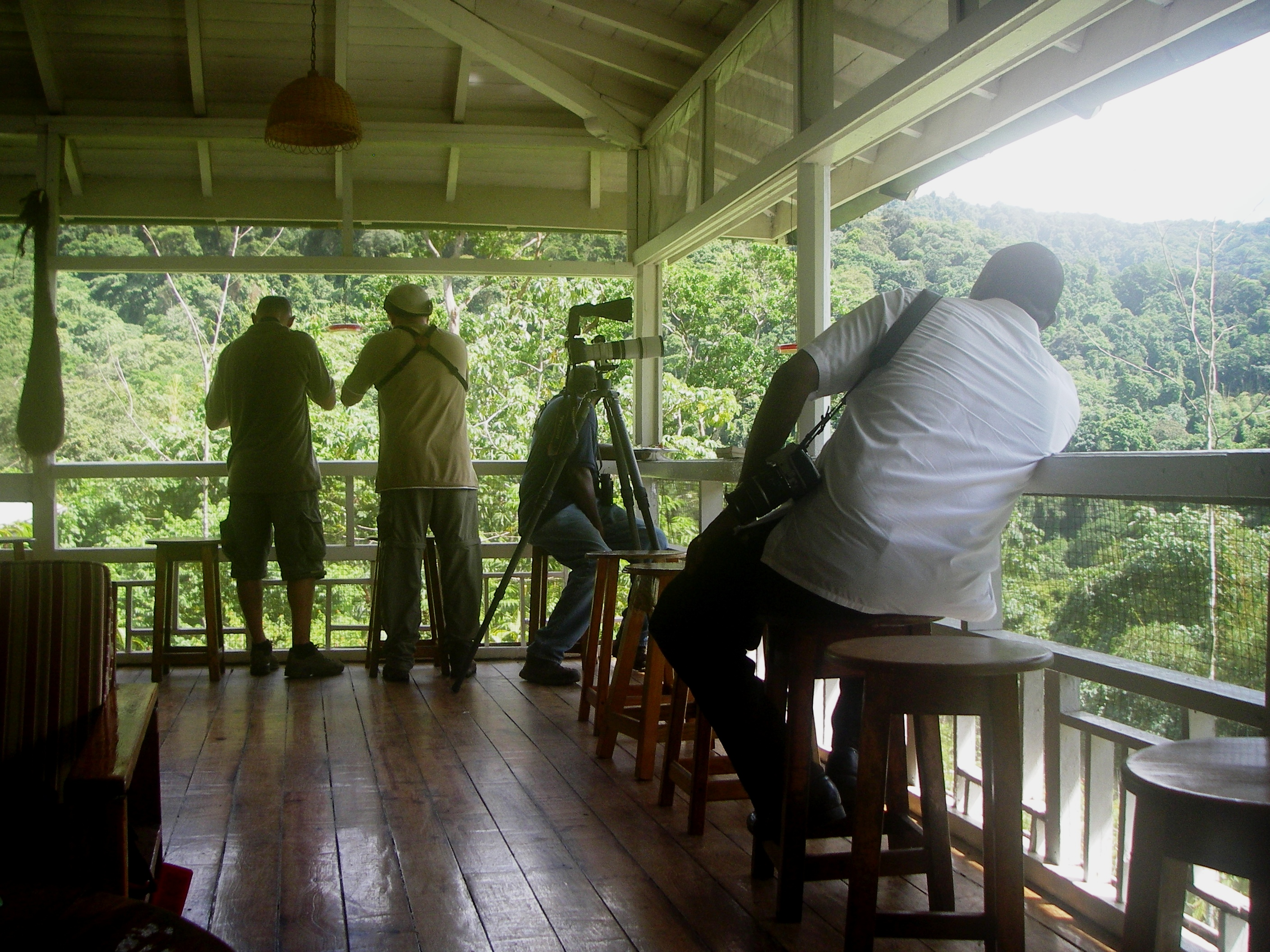
On the veranda

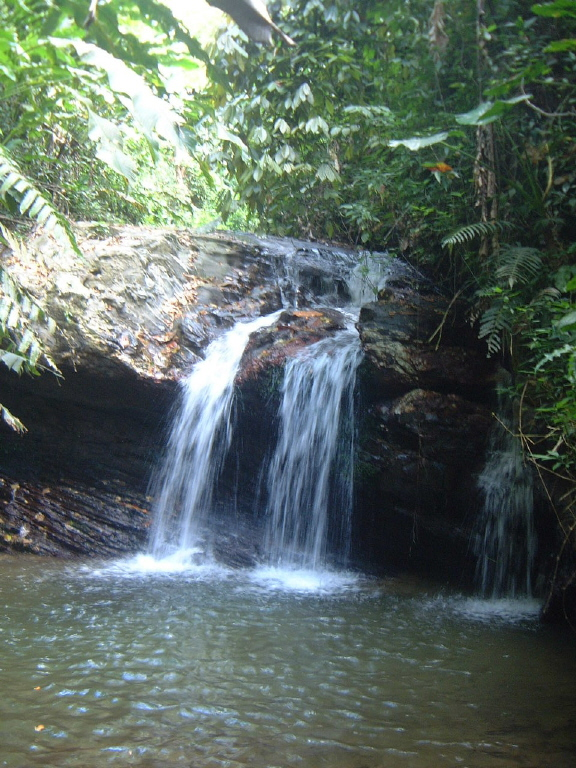
Waterfall in the grounds

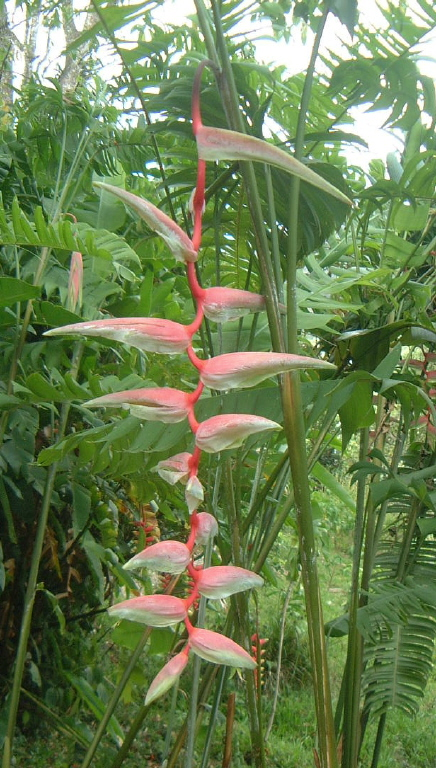
Heliconia 'Sexy Pink' in the grounds

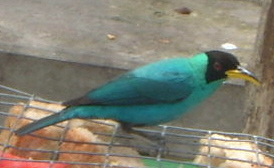
Green honeycreeper at the feeders

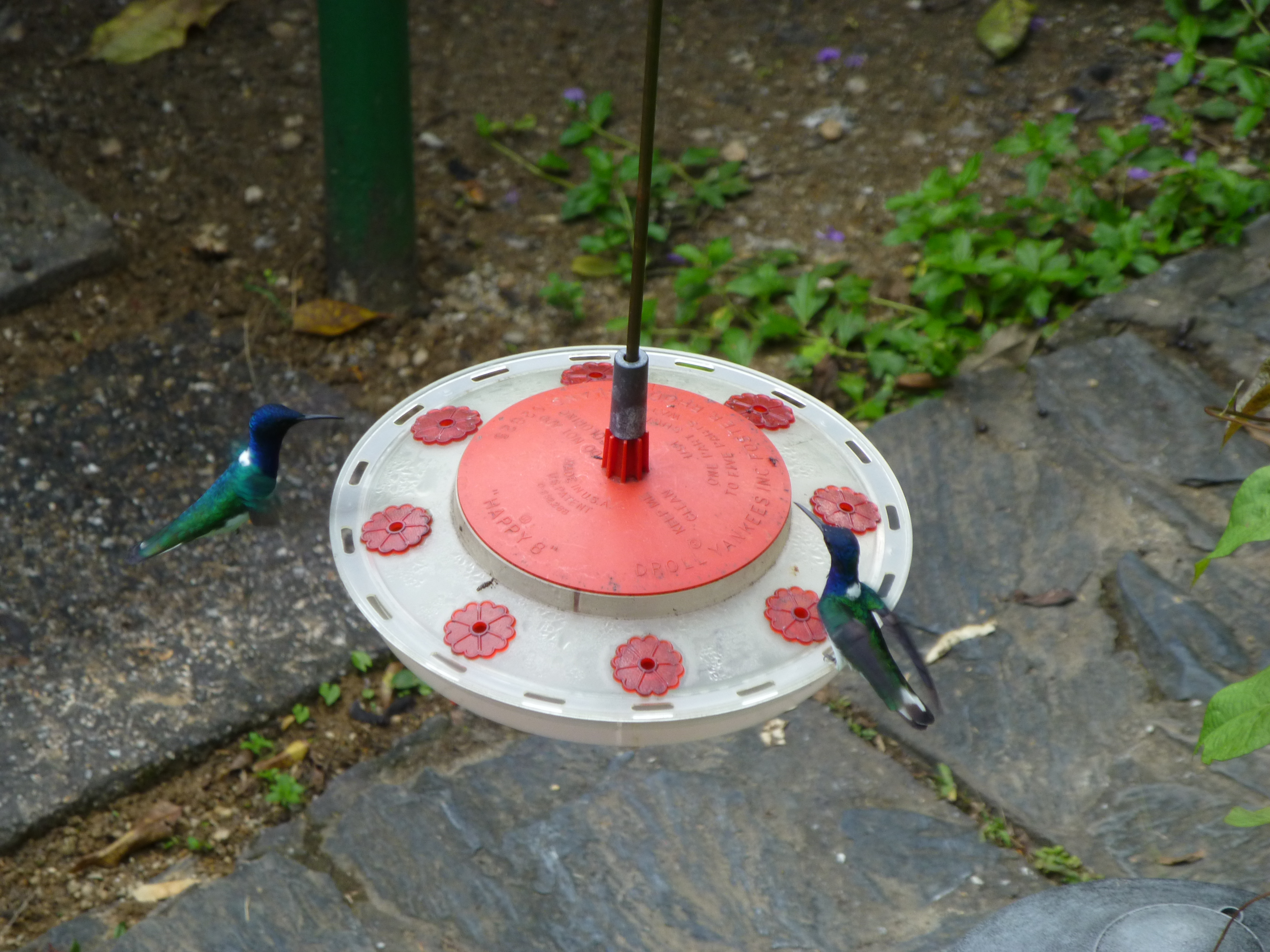
White-necked jacobins

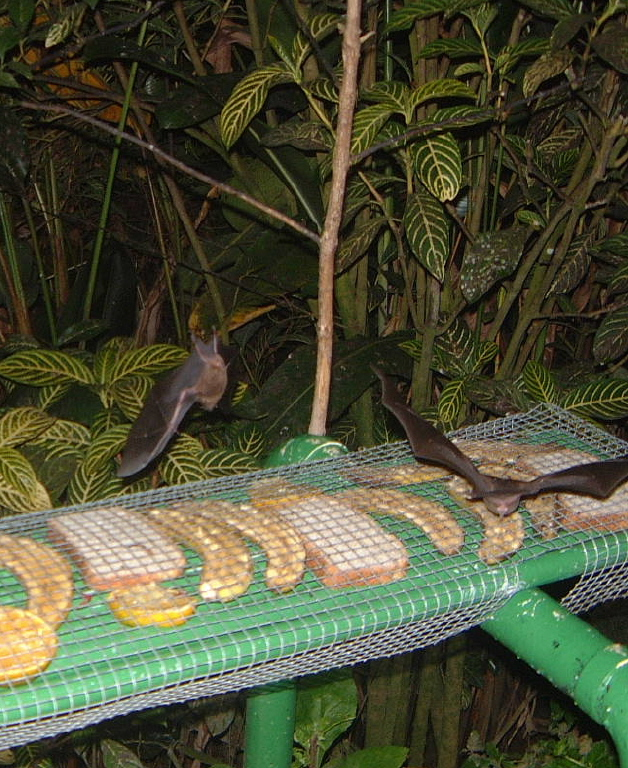
Fruit bats at the feeders

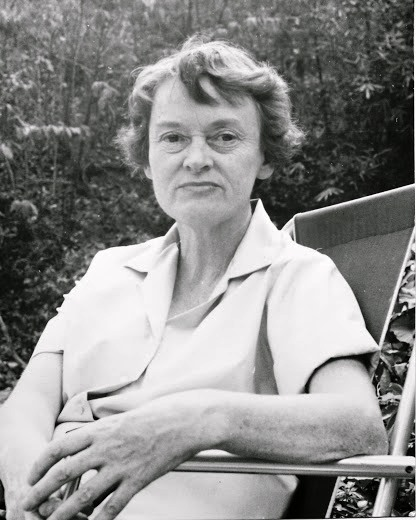
Jocelyn Crane visiting Centre c. 1960
