= Mentophobia =

Resistance to the idea of animal consciousness

Mentophobia or mentaphobia is a term used by Donald Griffin, an American zoologist and founder of cognitive ethology, for resistance among scientists to the idea that non-human animals are conscious. Griffin argued that a taboo "against scientific consideration of private, conscious, mental experiences" had led to the minimisation of the consciousness of non-human animals, as well as human consciousness, and that this was a barrier to scientific progress.

Mentophobia has been compared with Frans de Waal's concept of anthropodenial, which he defined as "a blindness to the humanlike characteristics of other animals, or the animal-like characteristics of ourselves". It has also been compared with Daniel Dennett's observation that people may accept uncertainty about human consciousness while still granting moral consideration to humans, but do not always extend the same approach to other animals.

In Contre la mentaphobie ("Against Mentaphobia"), David Chauvet argues that denying animal consciousness reduces the guilt associated with harms inflicted on animals.

== See also ==
- Anthropocentrism
- Ethics of uncertain sentience
- Pain in animals
- Sentientism
- Speciesism
