= List of plants known as oil palm =

Oil palm refers to several palms that yield oil from fruit pulp and seeds, primarily

- Elaeis guineensis, the African oil palm, the major palm oil crop species

but also:

- Attalea maripa, the maripa palm
- Cocos nucifera, the coconut palm, which yields coconut oil from its seeds
- Elaeis oleifera, the American oil palm
- The genus Elaeis, with just two species, E. guineensis and E. oleifera, referred to as the oil-palm genus

== See also ==
- Wax palm
