= Jocelyn Crane =

American zoologist and arachnologist (1909–1998)

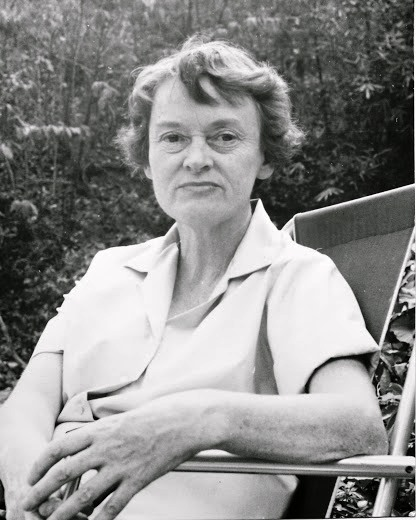
- Crane visiting William Beebe Tropical Research Station, Simla, Trinidad and Tobago c. 1960
- Born: June 11, 1909; St. Louis, Missouri
- Died: December 16, 1998 (aged 89); Concord, Massachusetts
- Other names: Jocelyn Crane Griffin
- Education: Smith College, Northampton, Massachusetts
- Occupation: Carcinologist
- Employer: New York Zoological Society
- Known for: Research on fiddler crabs
- Spouse: Donald R. Griffin (m. 1965)

Jocelyn Crane (June 11, 1909 – December 16, 1998), aka Jocelyn Crane Griffin, was an American carcinologist, most famous for her research on the fiddler crab and her work with the New York Zoological Society's (now the Wildlife Conservation Society) Department of Tropical Research.

She became a key figure and expert in ethology – concentrating on the behavior of tropical animals, jumping spiders, praying mantises, butterflies, and most importantly, fiddler crabs. Her lifelong research on fiddler crabs—researching their morphology, systematics, biogeography and behavior—was published in her 1975 seminal work Fiddler Crabs of the World.

== Biography ==
Crane was born in St. Louis, Missouri. She was educated at Smith College in Northampton, Massachusetts, graduating with a zoology degree in 1930.

== Career ==
In 1930, she went straight from university to become a laboratory assistant on William Beebe's staff for the Second Bermuda Oceanographic Expedition at the New York Zoological Society's Department for Tropical Research, which was based at Nonsuch Island, Bermuda.

In 1932, she was promoted to Laboratory Associate at the Department for Tropical Research. Her early work focused on the structure, distribution, and viability of surviving organisms concerning more than a hundred deep-sea fish and invertebrates. In 1933, Crane was given the new job title of Technical Associate and from 1934 began to write her own articles about her research at the department – her first entitled "Deep-sea Creatures of Six Net Hauls" which was published in the NYZS's Bulletin.

Crane continued to produce valuable scientific work with the department and turned her attention to the study of copepods. In 1935, she was able to identify around 60 species of copepods, of which almost half had never before been recorded in Bermuda. New data was recorded on color during life, swimming methods, breeding habits, growth stages, relative numbers of different species and sexes, diurnal migrations, effects of storms and currents, and general viability.

Her first scientific article came in 1936 during work in the West Indies. Published in Zoologica, it was titled "Notes on the Biology and Ecology of Giant Tuna, Thunnus thynnus Linnaeus, observed at Portland, Maine".

In 1938, her attention began to turn towards crabs, and she studied more than 200 species during the Eastern Pacific Zaca expedition that year. This interest continued in 1939 when she brought a catalog of 2,500 worldwide crab titles up to date and began papers on the life histories and evolution of crabs. This was to become the main interest of her career, the result being her 1975 publication on fiddler crabs.

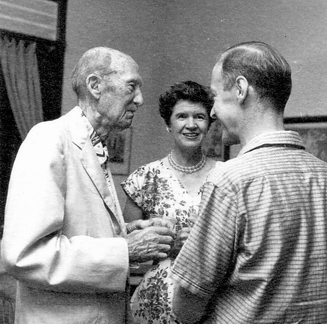
William Beebe, Crane, and Beebe's physician A. E. Hill at Simla in 1959

By 1942, Crane was working as a research zoologist, still with the Department of Tropical Research, which at this time was working in Venezuela. Crane was still studying crabs, in particular the genus Uca.

In 1944, Crane traveled again to Venezuela in order to find a place suitable for a new station of the Department of Tropical Research. She chose Rancho Grande, which was a large and unused building in the jungle at an altitude of 3,000 ft, 3 hours from Caracas. This was the department's base for 7 years until it moved to a new, permanent home at Simla, in the northern mountain range of Trinidad in 1951. Crane managed both the Venezuela and Trinidad stations for the department.

After Beebe's retirement in 1952, he remained as Director Emeritus, with Jocelyn Crane becoming the assistant director of the Department of Tropical Research.

Throughout her broadening administrative duties, Crane's scientific work never faltered, and in 1955, she was awarded a five-year grant from the National Science Foundation for worldwide crab studies. By 1961, her fiddler crab study was nearing its final stages, with 784 drawings already complete.

William Beebe died on June 4, 1962, and Crane was appointed as Director of the department, with the NYZS Annual Report that year noting that Crane had "accomplished much brilliant work advancing [the department's] purposes". She remained in this post until 1966 when she became administrator of the William Beebe Tropical Research Station. Additionally, from 1966 until her retirement in 1971, Crane was senior research zoologist with the Institute for Research on Animal Behavior – jointly operated by NYZS and Rockefeller University.

Jocelyn Crane retired from NYZS in 1971 but continued to have close associations with the Society by continuing to conduct research on fiddler crabs, and she published her seminal work Fiddler Crabs of the World in 1975.

At the time of her retirement, NYZS's impressive invertebrate collection of over 10,000 specimens was transferred to the Department of Invertebrates at the American Museum of Natural History. Crane retained the fiddler crab specimens until her book was published in 1975. These were later deposited with the United States National Museum (USNM), now the National Museum of Natural History, Smithsonian Institution.

=== Travels ===
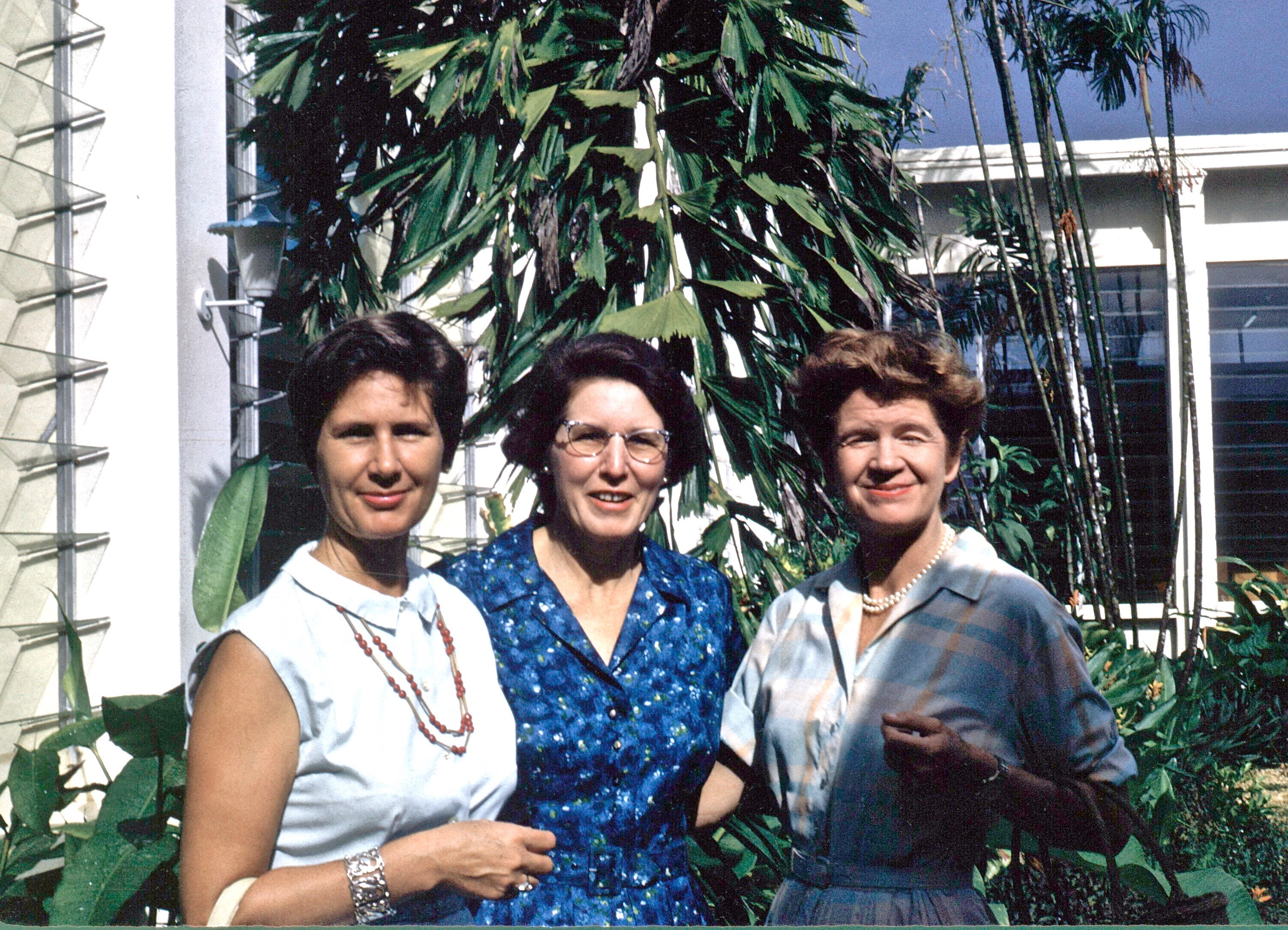
Jocelyn with friends Jennie Atkins and Eleanor Hill at Piarco Airport, Trinidad, 1963

Crane traveled extensively around the world, both for her scientific work and her own personal travels, often publishing accounts and articles connected to research undertaken during these trips. One impressive journey was her 1936 expedition to Iraq, where she undertook a 12,000-mile journey across Palestine and the Syrian desert to Baghdad. During her trip, she studied the flora and fauna of Kurdistan.

== Other endeavors and achievements ==
Crane was awarded an honorary Master of Science degree by Smith College in 1947 to honor her "studies of animals in their natural environment".

During her retirement, Crane returned to studying, earning a Ph.D. in Art History in 1991 from the Institute of Fine Arts of New York University. At the time of her death, she was working on a book, tentatively entitled "Talking Fingers". The main focus of her research in the arts related to the use of communicative human hand gestures as represented in art.

== Personal life ==
In 1965, Crane married Donald R. Griffin (as his second wife), with whom she worked at the Institute for Research in Animal Behavior. She died December 16, 1998, in Concord, Massachusetts.

== See also ==
- Taxa named by Jocelyn Crane
