= Wax palm =

Wax palm can refer to several species of palms, including:

- The genus Ceroxylon, particularly Ceroxylon quindiuense
- Copernicia alba
- Copernicia prunifera, the carnauba wax palm
- Cyrtostachys renda, the red candle-wax palm
