= Reference collection =

Collection of objects for study

A reference collection is a collection of objects maintained for the purposes of study, comparison, research, and authentication. While most commonly associated with libraries, reference collections can also be found in museums, archives, research institutions, and private holdings.

These collections are generally non-circulating, meaning that items cannot be checked out or removed from the premises, to ensure their availability and preservation for future users; and thus are not typically meant for general reading or entertainment, but rather for specific, detailed study and consultation. They may be very expensive items, such as a current encyclopedia, which the institution does not want to risk losing.

== Overview ==
The primary aim of reference collections is to provide a comprehensive and authoritative resource for researchers, students, professionals, and the general public. Reference collections are generally large undertakings maintained by institutions; instead of having a single representative of each object, they will typically have multiples, so as to illustrate variations and, sometimes, provide samples for comparison.

Items within a reference collection may include books, journals, manuscripts, samples, artifacts, and other primary and secondary sources of information. A reference collection may also include an assortment of damaged or manipulated items, fakes and forgeries, or items to be used for education and public outreach. The items are curated with inclusion is based on their relevance, accuracy, authenticity, and potential for future research needs.

These collections are often permanently housed in public institutions and used on site, such as those managed by universities or GLAM institutions (galleries, libraries, archives and museums). The earliest libraries were almost all reference libraries, but lending libraries became more common in the 18th century with circulating libraries subscription libraries, followed by free public libraries. Occasionally, reference collections (notably, highly specific and specialized collections or art collections) can be found in private ownership.

As new knowledge emerges and older materials become less relevant or outdated, the reference collection may undergo periodic reviews and updates to ensure its continued usefulness and reliability.

== Typical formats ==
Within academic, open source, and research libraries, there are various sources that cater to specific types of information. The table below provides an inexhaustive overview of these typical information repositories.

Name	Description
Almanacs	Annual publications with current information on various topics like weather, news, etc.
Artifact collections	Collections of historical or culturally significant items.
Atlases	Books of maps detailing both physical and political features of regions.
Bibliographies	Lists of books, articles, and other resources focused on specific subjects.
Biographies	Detailed accounts of individuals' lives, both personal and professional.
Chronologies	Documents events over time, frequently in a timeline fashion.
Code repositories	Databases that store, manage, and track changes in source code.
Dictionaries	Books providing definitions, pronunciations, and forms of words.
Digests	Organized collections of summaries of longer documents in a specific area.
Directories	Provide contact and background information for people and organizations.
Encyclopedias	Sets of books with short articles on a multitude of topics.
Gazetteers	Geographical dictionaries detailing information on specific places.
Handbooks	Practitioners' guides specific to fields of study or work.
Indexes	Guides to articles in periodicals and newspapers.
Physical Collections	Tangible items grouped together for study or reference purposes.
Pictorial Works	Materials using visuals, like photographs or drawings, to clarify topics.
Microscopy Slide Collections	Type slides, often used biology and medicine.
Statistical Works	Processes that involve collecting, analyzing, and summarizing data numerically.
Yearbooks	Provide statistical data and articles updating information in various areas.

== Significance in academic research ==
In biology, reference collections, such as herbaria are a source of information about variations of populations within a species. They are also the repository of nomenclatural type specimens used to fix the circumscription of the taxonomic name.

In philately, reference collections are critical to expertization, since the characteristics differentiating authentic stamps from reprints, fakes, and forgeries are often too subtle to be described verbally.

== See also ==
- List of academic databases and search engines
- Antiquities trade
- Archive
- Open source
- Open access
- Private museum
- Information repository
- Typology (disambiguation)
