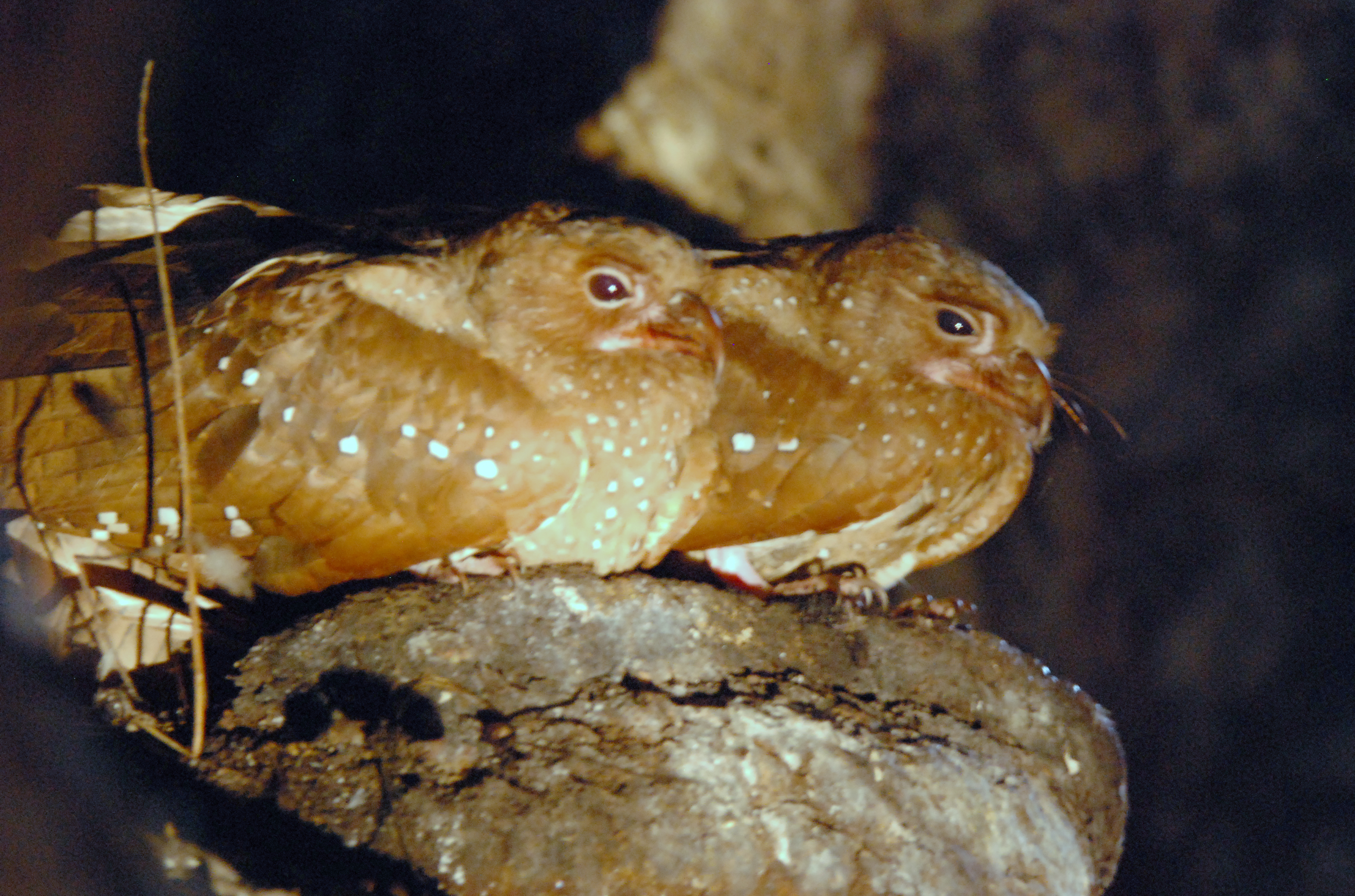

Conservation status
- Least Concern (IUCN 3.1)

Scientific classification
- Kingdom: Animalia
- Phylum: Chordata
- Class: Aves
- Clade: Vanescaves
- Order: Steatornithiformes
- Family: Steatornithidae
- Genus: Steatornis; Humboldt, 1814
- Species: S. caripensis

Binomial name
- Steatornis caripensis Humboldt, 1817

= Oilbird =

Species of bird

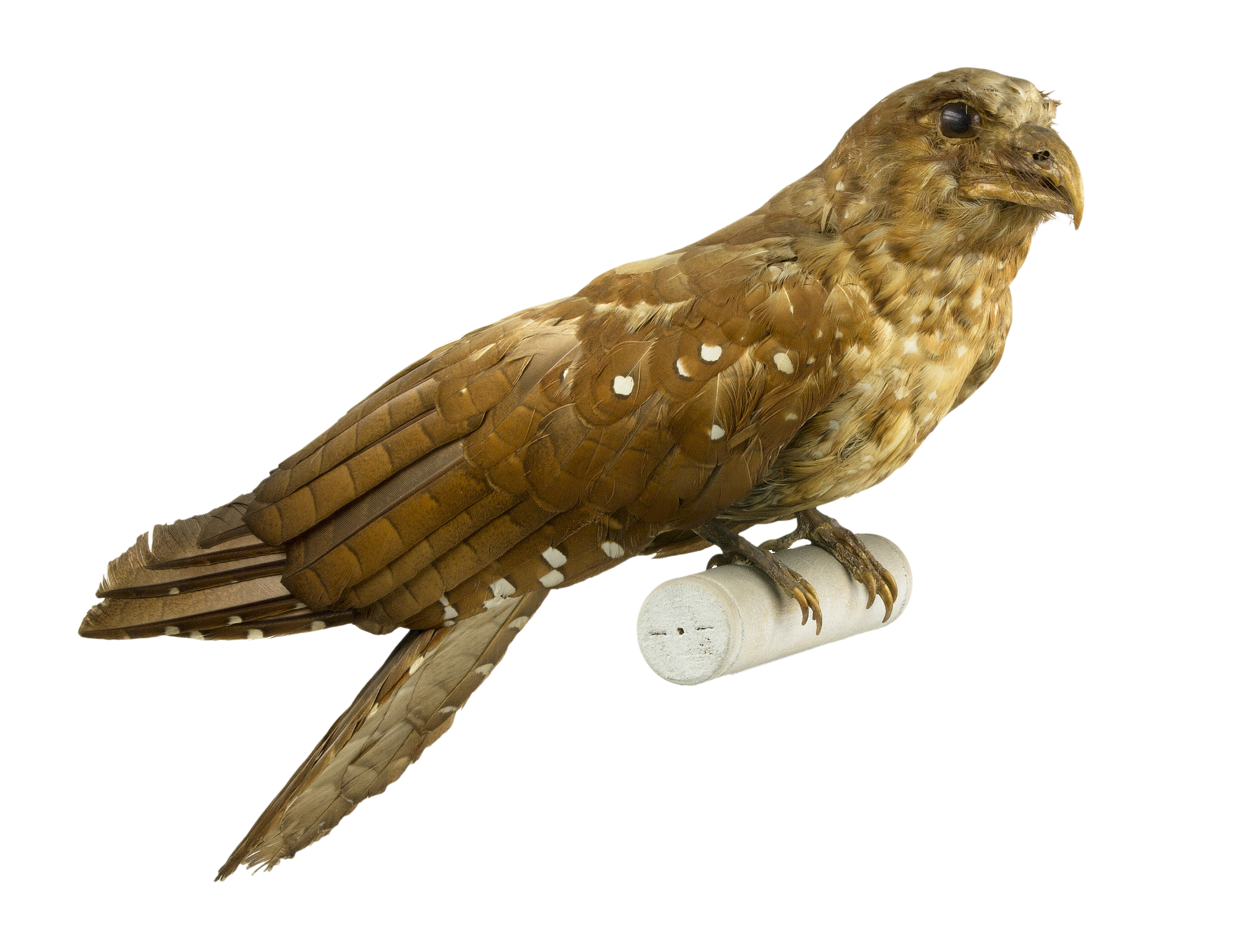
Steatornis caripensis – MHNT

The oilbird (Steatornis caripensis), locally known as the guácharo, is a bird species found in the northern areas of South America including the Caribbean island of Trinidad. It is the only living species in the genus Steatornis, the family Steatornithidae, and the order Steatornithiformes. Nesting in colonies in caves, oilbirds are nocturnal feeders on the fruits of the oil palm and tropical laurels. They are the only nocturnal flying fruit-eating birds in the world (the kākāpō, also nocturnal, is flightless). They forage at night, with specially adapted eyesight. However, they navigate by echolocation in the same way as bats, one of the few birds to do so. They produce a high-pitched clicking sound of around 2 kHz that is audible to humans.

== Taxonomy ==
Oilbirds are related to the nightjars, both being in Strisores, and were previously placed alongside nightjars in the order Caprimulgiformes. However, the nightjars and their relatives are insectivores while the oilbird is a specialist frugivore, and it is now deemed sufficiently distinctive to be placed in its own order Steatornithiformes, suborder Steatornithes, and family Steatornithidae.

The fossil record of the family suggests that they were once more widely distributed around the globe. The first fossil oilbird was described by Storrs Olson in 1987 from a fossil found in the Green River Formation in Wyoming. The species, Prefica nivea, was probably not adapted to hovering flight or living in caves, unlike the oilbird. Some of the same families and genera of plants the present day oilbird feeds on have been found in the Green River Formation, suggesting that prehistoric species may have eaten the same fruit and spread the same seeds. Another species from the Upper Eocene has been discovered in France.

== Etymology ==
The specific name caripensis means "of Caripe", the town in Venezuela in which they were scientifically classified in 1799, and the generic name Steatornis means "fat bird", in reference to the fattiness of the chicks. The oilbird is called a guácharo or tayo in Spanish, both terms being of indigenous origin. In Trinidad it was sometimes called diablotin (French for "little devil"), presumably referring to its loud cries, which have been likened to those of tortured men.

The common name oilbird comes from the fact that in the past chicks were captured and boiled down in order to make oil. Alexander von Humboldt described how this oil was made at the Cueva del Guácharo near Caripe, where once a year, around midsummer, local Indigenous people destroyed most of the nests with poles and killed several thousand birds:

The young, which fall to the ground, are opened on the spot. Their peritoneum is found extremely loaded with fat, and a layer of fat reaches from the abdomen to the anus, forming a kind of cushion between the legs of the bird. ... At the period commonly called, at Caripe, the oil harvest, the Indians build huts with palm-leaves, near the entrance, and even in the porch of the cavern. There, with a fire of brushwood, they melt in pots of clay the fat of the young birds just killed. This fat is known by the name of butter or oil (manteca, or aceite) of the guacharo. It is half liquid, transparent, without smell, and so pure that it may be kept above a year without becoming rancid. At the convent of Caripe no other oil is used in the kitchen of the monks but that of the cavern; and we never observed that it gave the aliments a disagreeable taste or smell.

== Description ==
This is a large, slim bird at 40–49 cm (16–19 in), with a wing span of 95 cm (37 in). It has a flattened, powerfully hooked, beak surrounded by deep chestnut rictal bristles up to 5 centimetres (2.0 in) long. The adult weighs 350–475 g (12.3–16.8 oz) but the chicks can weigh considerably more, at up to 600 grams (21 oz), when their parents feed them a good deal of fruit before they fly. The feathers of the oilbird are soft like those of many nightbirds, but not as soft as those of owls or nightjars, as they do not need to be silent like predatory species. The oilbird is mainly reddish-brown with white spots on the nape and wings. Lower parts are cinnamon-buff with white diamond-shaped spots edged in black, these spots start small towards the throat and get larger towards the back. The stiff tail feathers are a rich brown spotted with white on either side.

The feet are small and almost useless, other than for clinging to vertical surfaces. The long wings have evolved to make it capable of hovering and twisting flight, which enables it to navigate through restricted areas of its caves. For example, the wings have deep wingtip slotting, like New World vultures, to reduce the stalling speed, and the wings have a low aspect ratio and low wing-loading, all to make the oilbird capable of flying at low speeds.

The eyes of oilbirds are highly adapted to nocturnal foraging. The eyes are small, but the pupils are relatively large, allowing the highest light-gathering capacity of any bird (f-number of 1.07). The retina is dominated by rod cells, 1,000,000 rods per mm^{2}, the highest density of any vertebrate eye, which are organised in layers, an arrangement unique among birds but shared by deep-sea fish. They have low numbers of cone cells, and the whole arrangement would allow them to capture more light in low light conditions but probably have poor vision in daylight.

Although they have specially adapted vision to forage by sight, they are among the few birds known to supplement sight by echolocation in sufficiently poor light conditions, using a series of sharp audible clicks for this purpose. The only other birds known to do this are some species of swift.

In addition to clicks used for echolocation, oilbirds also produce a variety of harsh screams while in their caves. Entering a cave with a light especially provokes these raucous calls; they also may be heard as the birds prepare to emerge from a cave at dusk.

== Distribution and habitat ==
The oilbird ranges from Guyana and both Trinidad and Tobago to Venezuela, Colombia, Ecuador, Peru, Bolivia and Brazil. They range from sea-level to 3,400 m (11,200 ft).

The species has specific habitat requirements, needing both caves to breed in and roost in frequently, and forest containing fruiting trees. Where suitable caves are absent but select fruiting trees are present, oilbirds will roost and breed in narrow gorges and grottos with suitable rock shelves. One such colony in Ecuador held a population of a hundred birds in a canyon with ledges protected by vegetation. Some smaller caves and gorges are used only for roosting. While it was once thought that oilbirds always or nearly always roosted in caves, canyons or gullies, researchers placing GPS trackers on non-breeding birds found that they also regularly roost in trees in the forest.

It is a seasonal migrant across some of its range, moving from its breeding caves in search of fruit trees. It has occurred as a rare vagrant to Costa Rica, Panama and Aruba. The Cueva del Guácharo National Park (Oilbird Cave National Park), in the mountainous Caripe district of northern Monagas, Venezuela, is where Alexander von Humboldt first studied the species.

== Behaviour ==
Oilbirds are nocturnal. During the day the birds rest on cave ledges and leave at night to find fruit outside the cave. It was once thought that oilbirds only roosted in caves, and indeed never saw daylight, but studies using GPS/acceleration loggers found that non-breeding birds only roosted in caves or other rock shelters one night in three, the other nights roosting in trees.

The scientists responsible for the discovery also found that birds roosting in caves were highly active through the night, whereas birds roosting in the forest were far less active. They hypothesised that each environment carried costs; birds roosting in the forest were more vulnerable to predators and birds roosting in caves expended considerable energy competing with rivals and defending nesting and roosting ledges.

=== Breeding ===
Oilbirds are colonial cave nesters. The nest is a heap of droppings, usually above water—either a stream or the sea—on which 2–4 glossy white eggs are laid which soon become stained brown. These are rounded but with a distinctly pointed smaller end and average 41.2 millimetres (1.62 in) by 33.2 millimetres (1.31 in). The squabs become very fat before fledging, weighing around a third more than the adult birds.

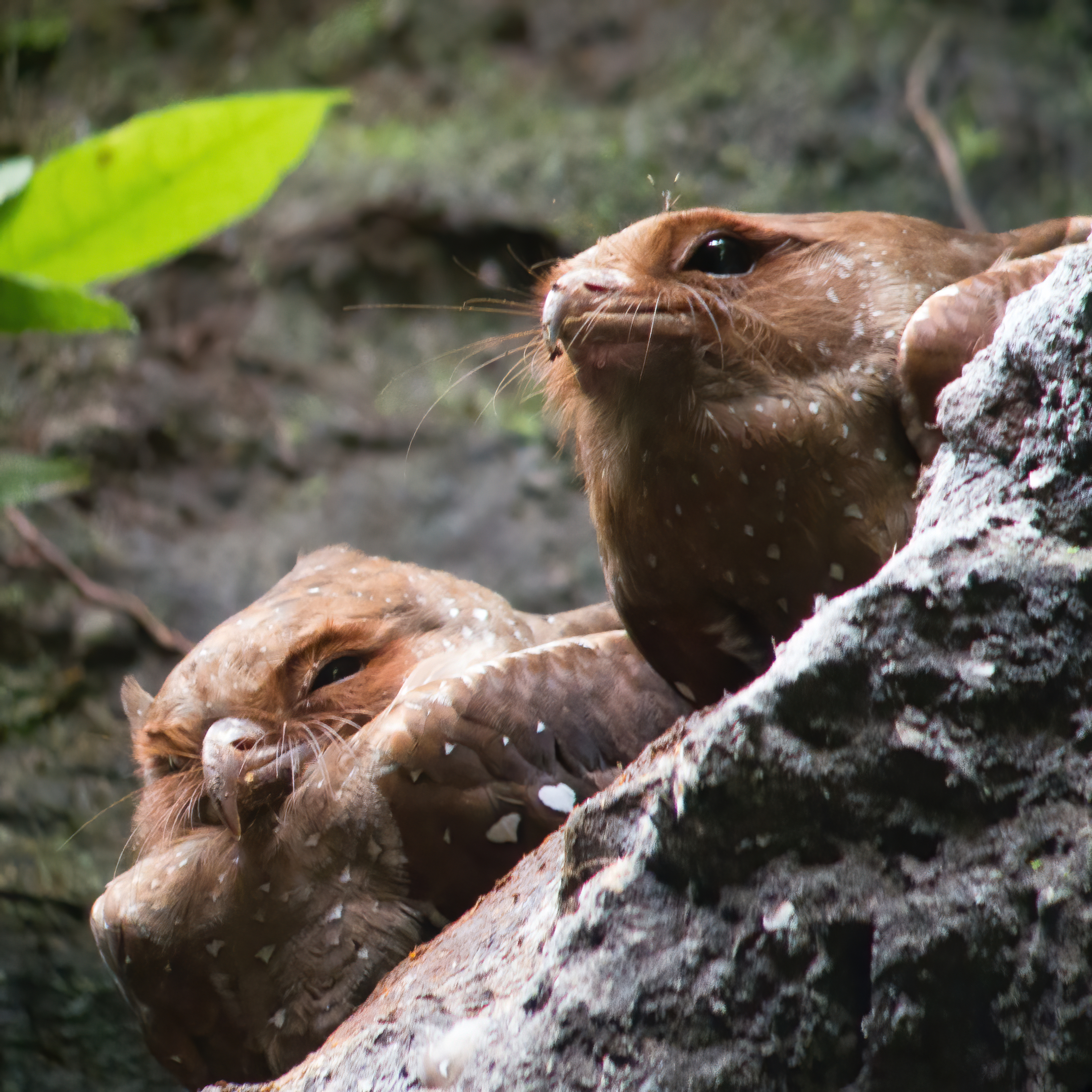
Oilbirds roosting on a more open ledge in Ecuador

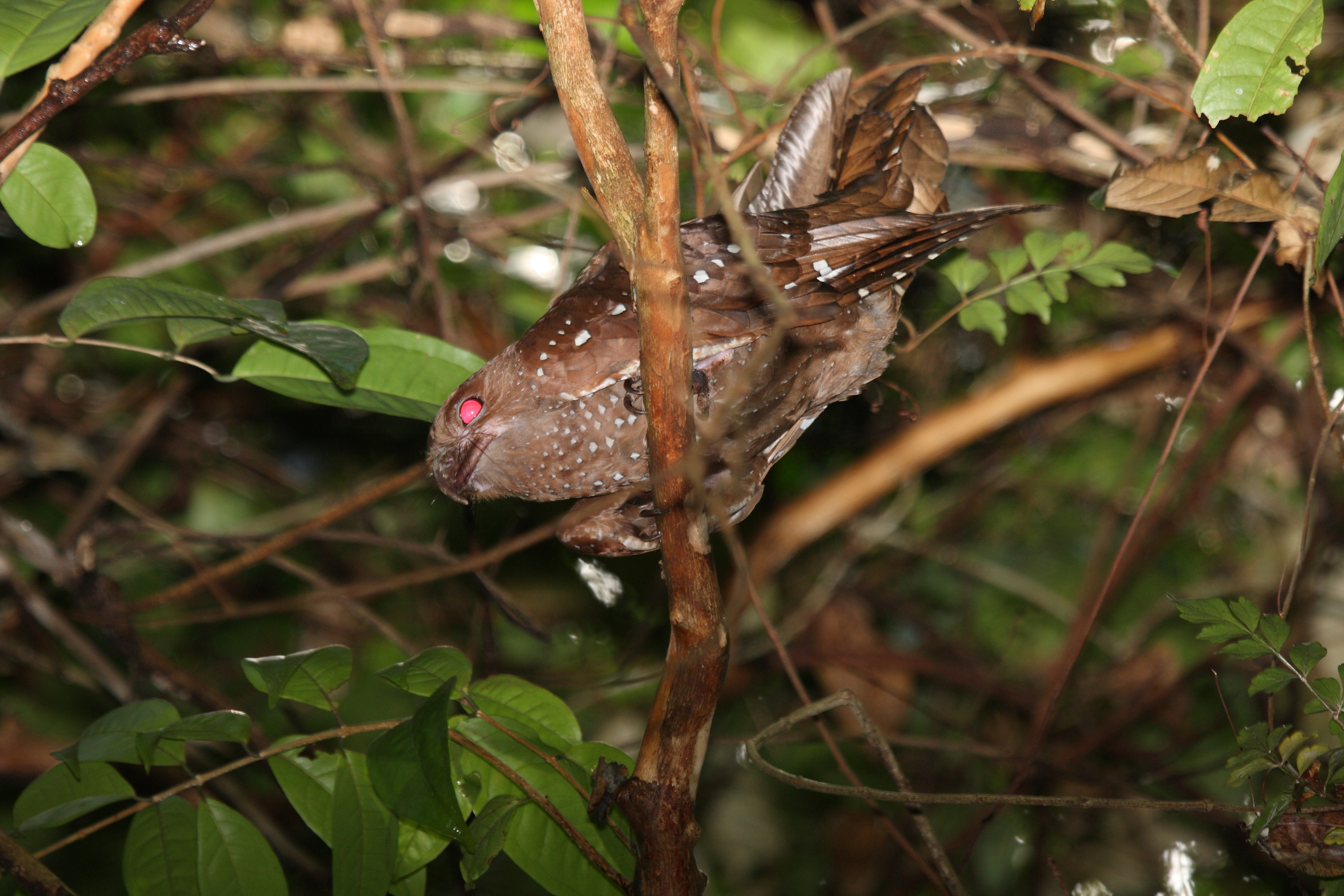
The widespread habit of roosting in trees was only recently discovered by scientists

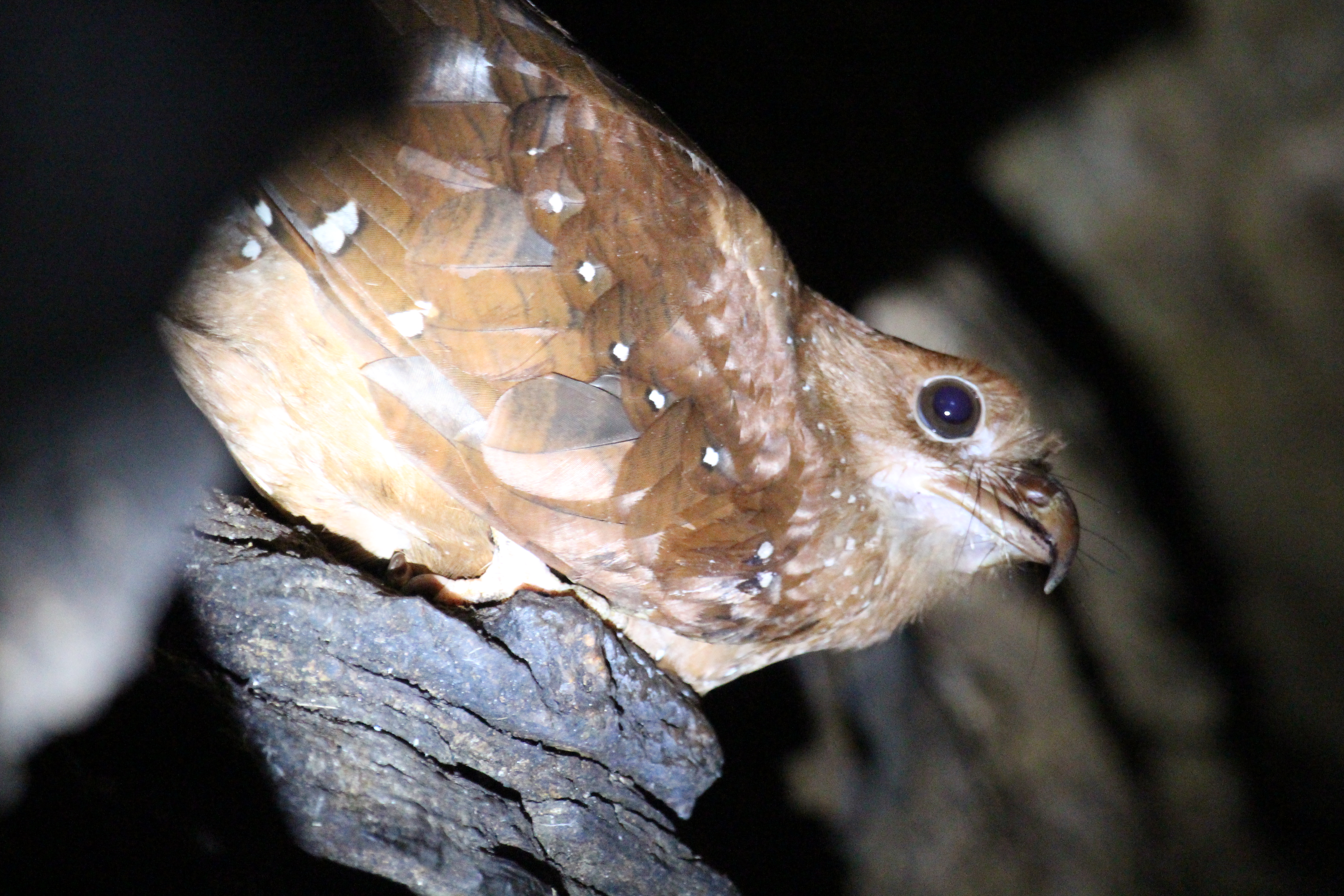
Oilbird on a ledge in a cave

== Status and conservation ==
The Guácharo Cave was Venezuela's first national monument and is the centerpiece of a national park; according to some estimates there may be 15,000 or more birds living there. Colombia also has a national park named after its "Cueva de los Guácharos", near the southern border with Ecuador. Oilbirds have been reported in various other places along the Andean mountain chain, including near Ecuador's Cueva de los Tayos and in Brazil: they are known to dwell as far south as the Carrasco National Park in Bolivia. Dunston Cave, at the Asa Wright Nature Centre in Trinidad, is home to about 130 individuals.

The species is classified as 'Least Concern' by the IUCN as of 2021, with a stable population, estimated to be 20,000 – 50,000 mature individuals.
