= Omar H. Ali =

American historian (born 1971)

Omar Hamid Ali (born February 10, 1971) Historian and ethnographer of the global African Diaspora who explores the political, cultural, and scientific contributions of Africans and people of African descent across the Atlantic, Mediterranean, and Indian Ocean worlds.

== Life ==
Of East Indian and Peruvian background, Ali is a distinguished professor of History and Black Studies serving as Rosenthal Excellence Professor in the College of Arts & Sciences and Dean Emeritus of Lloyd International Honors College at the University of North Carolina, Greensboro. He is on the faculty of the Department of History and the African American and African Diaspora Studies Program, as well as a Research Associate in the Medicinal Chemistry Collaborative in the Department of Chemistry and Biochemistry at UNCG. He was a Fulbright professor of history and anthropology at Universidad Nacional de Colombia, a visiting professor in the Program for African American and Diaspora Studies at Vanderbilt University, and a Library Scholar at the David Rockefeller Center for Latin American Studies at Harvard University. A graduate of the London School of Economics and Political Science, he studied anthropology at the School of Oriental and African Studies and conducted fieldwork in West Africa with anthropologist Maxwell Owusu before receiving his Ph.D. in history from Columbia University in 2003 under the direction of Eric Foner.

Ali is the author of eight books, including Malik Ambar: Power and Slavery Across the Indian Ocean World (Oxford University Press, 2016) and In the Lion's Mouth: Black Populism in the New South (University Press of Mississippi, 2010), and wrote the narrative for The African Diaspora in the Indian Ocean World exhibit for the Schomburg Center for Research in Black Culture in collaboration with curator Sylviane Diouf. Selected as the 2016 Carnegie Foundation North Carolina Professor of the Year, he has served as a Road Scholar for the North Carolina Humanities Council and History and Geography Deputy Inspector for the French Ministry of Education; he has also served on the History Academic Advisory Committee of the College Board and the Teaching Prize Committee for the World History Association; and he was a member of the board of directors of the All Stars Project, IndependentVoting.org, and the Cone Health Foundation. He has appeared on CNN, NPR, Al Jazeera, Telemundo, C-SPAN, and PBS, among other networks.

== Selected bibliography ==
- "Independent Black Politics", editor, Souls: A Critical Journal of Black Politics, Culture, and Society Vol. 7, No. 2 (Spring 2005).
- "Standing Guard at the Door of Liberty: Black Populism in South Carolina, 1886-1897," South Carolina Historical Magazine, Vol. 107, No. 3 (July 2006)
- "Islam and the African Diaspora in the Indian Ocean World", in Black Past: Remembered and Reclaimed (2009)
- "Lenora Branch Fulani: Challenging the Rules of the Game", in African Americans and the Presidency: The Road to the White House, B. Glasrud, et al., eds. (New York: Routledge, 2010)
- "Islam, Trade, and Empire", in Africa and the Wider World, by Hakeem Tijani, Raphael Njoku, et al., eds. (Boston, MA: Pearson, 2010)
- In the Lion's Mouth: Black Populism in the New South, 1886-1900 (Jackson: University Press of Mississippi, 2010), foreword by Robin D. G. Kelley
- "The African Diaspora in the Indian Ocean World," Schomburg Center for Research in Black Culture (The New York Public Library, 2011)
- "Fulani's Tools and Results," Palimpsest: A Journal on Women, Gender and the Black International, Vol. 1, No. 1 (Spring 2012)
- "Black Populism: Agrarian Politics from the Colored Alliance to the People's Party" in Beyond Forty Acres and a Mule: African American Farmers Since Reconstruction, Debra A. Reid and Evan P. Bennett, eds. (Gainesville: University Press of Florida, 2012)
- "Re-Conceptualizing Black Populism" in Southern Populism Revisited: New Interpretations and New Departures, James M. Beeby eds. (Jackson: University Press of Mississippi, 2012)
- "The Mu'azzin's Song: Islam and the African Diaspora of the Indian Ocean," North Carolina Conversations, Vol. 6, Issue 1 (Winter-Spring, 2012)
- "The African Diaspora in Latin America: Afro-Peru and San Martin de Porres," New African Review, Vol. 2, Issue 4 (Summer 2013)
- "Benkos Biohó: African Maroon Leadership in New Grenada", in Atlantic Biographies: Individuals and Peoples in the Atlantic World, M. Meuwese and J. Fortin, eds (Boston, MA: Brill, 2013)
- "Afro-Peru: A Legacy of Black Labor and Culture," Revista: Harvard Review of Latin America, Vol. XIII, No. 4 (Fall 2014)
- Islam in the Indian Ocean World: A Brief History with Documents (Boston, MA: Bedford St. Martin's Press, 2016)
- Malik Ambar: Power and Slavery Across the Indian Ocean (New York: Oxford University Press, 2016)
- In the Balance of Power: Independent Black Politics and Third Party Movements in the United States (Athens: Ohio University Press, 2020, second edition), foreword by Eric Foner
- Africans in the Ancient Mediterranean World: Primary Sources from Classical Antiquity (Indianapolis, IN: Hackett Publishing, 2026), with Rebecca Muich
