= Syuejia Wetland =

Syuejia Wetland is located in the northern part of Syuejia District, Tainan, Taiwan, near the Fazaidou Settlement in Guanghua Village. Once farmland along the banks of the Jishui River, the area was gradually abandoned as the river changed course. Combined with the effects of land subsidence, the abandoned farmland eventually evolved into a wetland ecological park covering approximately 20 hectares. Today, Syuejia Wetland is home to internationally protected species such as the black-faced spoonbill, as well as a wide variety of bird species, plant species, and crabs.

== Geography ==
Syuejia Wetland is located in the northern part of Syuejia District, Tainan, adjacent to the Fazaidou Settlement in neighboring Beimen District. The wetland occupies land in the Zhongzhou, Syuejia, and Duzitou cadastral sections along the Jishui River.

The wetland was formed from sediment deposited in the former Daofeng Inland Sea. Around 300 years ago, the area consisted of saline land with dry, hardened soil that was prone to cracking. Over time, erosion and sediment deposition by the Jishui River gradually transformed the area into cultivable mudflats. The soil eventually developed into silty loam, a fertile, fine-textured soil with good moisture retention.

== History ==
The area was originally an agricultural settlement known as Ganziliao. However, severe land subsidence during the 1990s caused frequent flooding during flood releases from the upstream Baihe Reservoir. As a result, the farmland became salinized and lost its fertility, making cultivation no longer possible. Consequently, the entire farming community relocated in October 1997. Left unmanaged and increasingly affected by seawater intrusion, the remaining farmland gradually deteriorated and eventually evolved into the wetland seen today.

Although the Tainan City Government's Water Resources Bureau constructed levees in the area, it did not acquire the surrounding farmland. As a result, much of the farmland gradually became part of the river's floodplain. To compensate local farmers and conserve soil and water resources, the Syuejia District Farmers' Association secured funding from the Forestry Bureau of the Council of Agriculture (now the Forestry and Nature Conservation Agency under the Ministry of Agriculture). Through a fallow land subsidy program, the association leased the farmland and subsequently converted it into a wetland ecological park. While some of the land remains privately owned by farmers, most of the park consists of public land and designated floodplain areas.

== Ecology ==
The Syuejia District Farmers' Association also commissioned the Tainan Society for Nature Conservation to conduct ecological surveys of the wetland, including bird monitoring and vegetation studies. As human disturbance diminished, abundant food resources and the shelter provided by the levees from strong winds attracted increasing numbers of birds. The wetland's ecosystem gradually became more diverse, eventually providing an ideal habitat for waterbirds, crabs, mangroves, and a wide variety of other species.

In February 2011, the Tainan Society for Nature Conservation recorded its first large flock of Black-faced Spoonbills, an internationally protected species often referred to as a "star bird." The highest recorded count has since exceeded 500 individuals. The wetland is also home to numerous resident and migratory bird species, including the little egret, intermediate egret, black-winged stilt, whimbrel, common redshank, wood sandpiper, common moorhen, red-necked stint, common sandpiper, kentish plover, black-crowned night heron, black-bellied tern, and the invasive sacred ibis.

The wetland also supports a rich diversity of crab species, including the arcuate fiddler crab (Tubuca arcuata), the white fiddler crab (Austruca lactea), and the northern calling fiddler crab (Gelasimus borealis). Botanical surveys have recorded 42 plant species belonging to 21 families, including 13 species from five families that were newly recorded in the area in 2011. The wetland possesses abundant ecological resources and is considered worthy of continued ecological restoration and conservation.
