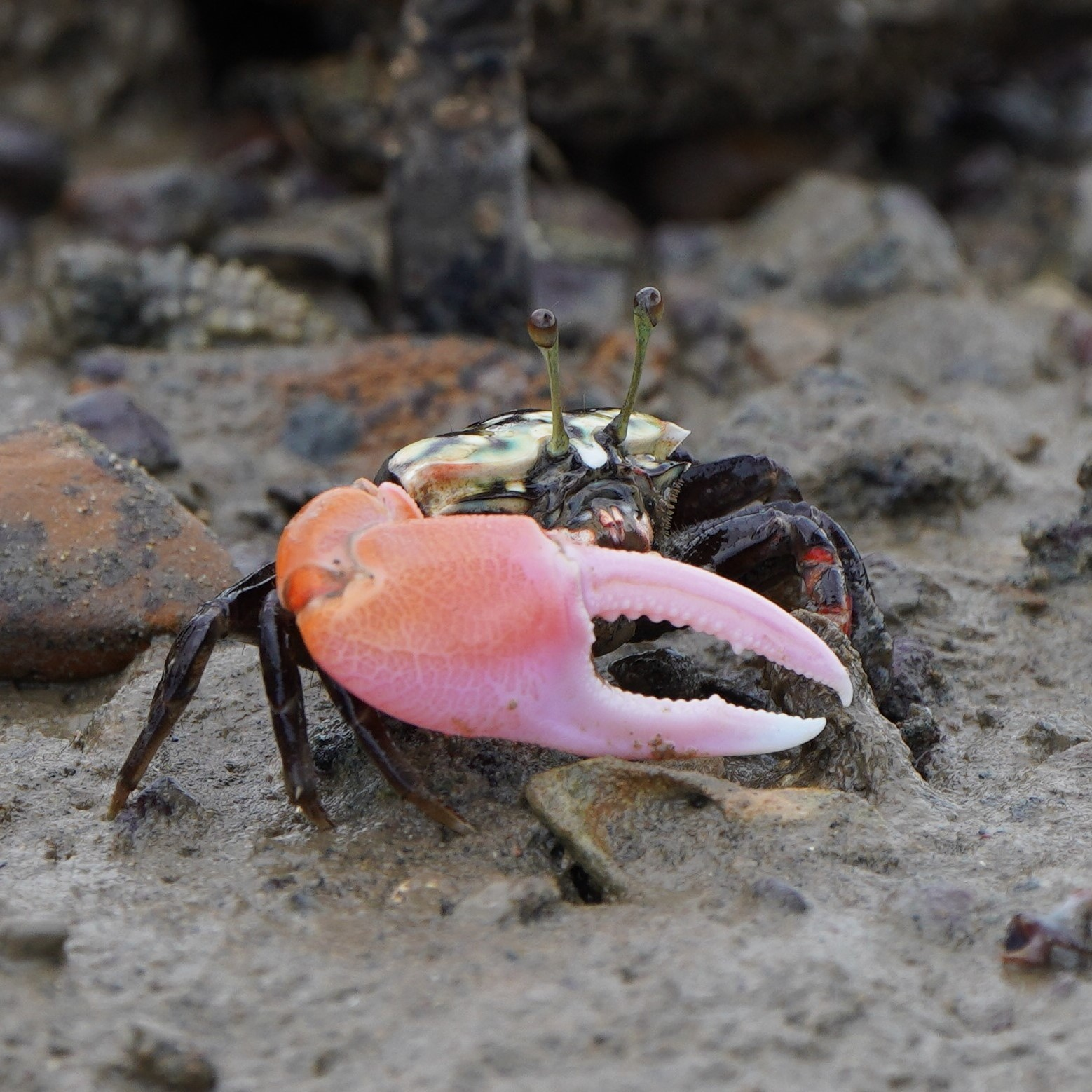

Scientific classification
- Kingdom: Animalia
- Phylum: Arthropoda
- Class: Malacostraca
- Order: Decapoda
- Suborder: Pleocyemata
- Infraorder: Brachyura
- Family: Ocypodidae
- Subfamily: Gelasiminae
- Tribe: Gelasimini
- Genus: Tubuca
- Species: T. polita

Binomial name
- Tubuca polita (Crane, 1975)

= Tubuca polita =

Species of fiddler crab

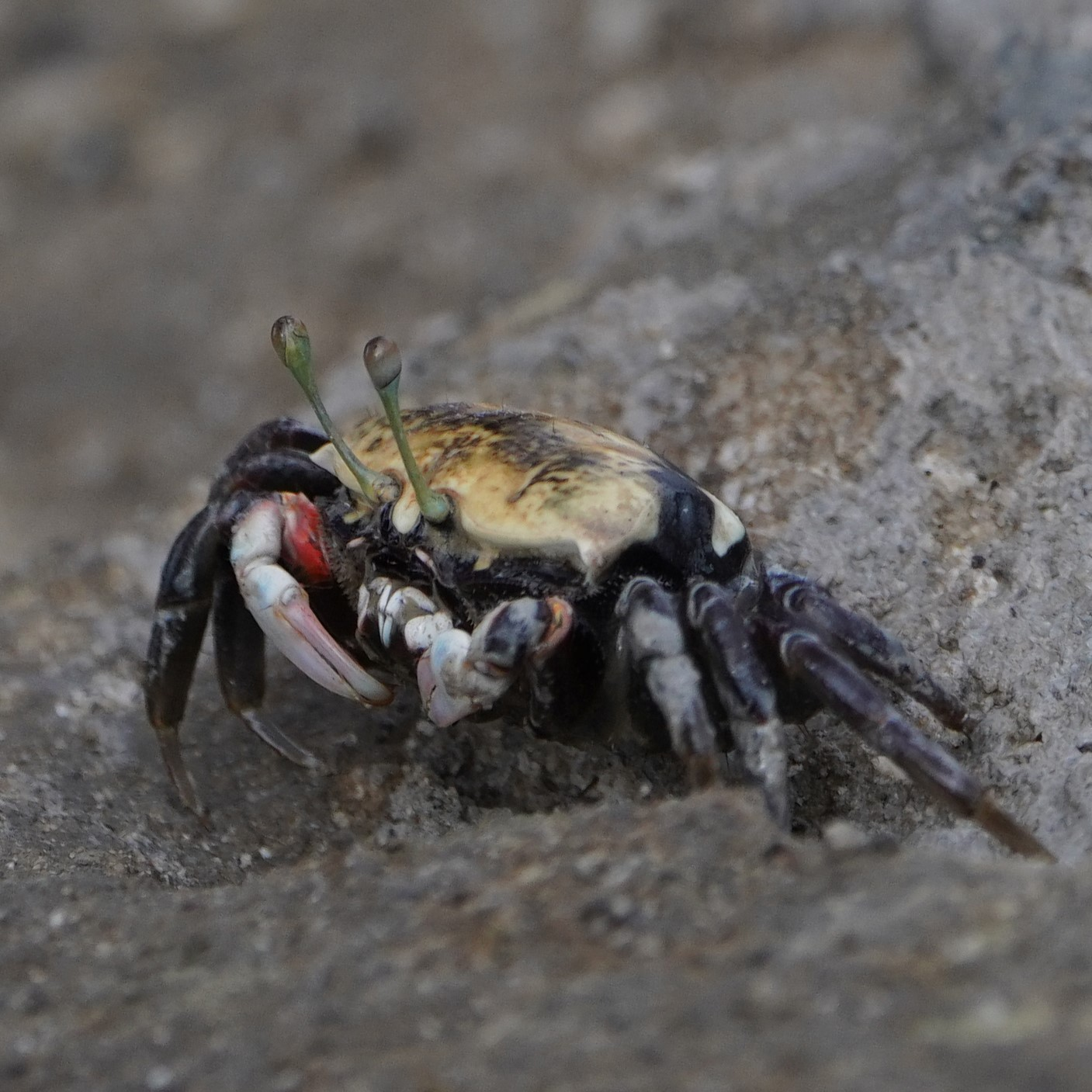
Tubuca polita

Tubuca polita, commonly known as the polished fiddler crab or pink-clawed fiddler crab, is a species of fiddler crab that is found in the northern part of Australia including the Torres Strait Islands.

Tubuca polita was formerly a member of the genus Uca, but in 2016 it was placed in the genus Tubuca, a former subgenus of Uca.

The name polita comes from the unusually smooth ("polished") surface of the "manus" (the lower claw and wrist).

== Description ==
Like other fiddler crabs, Tubuca polita males have one claw that is significantly larger than the other, while females have two equal-sized smaller claws. It has a brown and blue-black carapace with cream or grey green marbling, or in some areas yellow or occasionally orange or pink. The male claw has a rose pink hand with white fingers. The width of the carapace is up to around 25 mm.

This species is found adjacent to mangroves on the seaward side. They live in mud or sandy mud, in burrows, but on flats rather than steep banks. They are often found together with Gelasimus vomeris and Tubuca seismella crabs. Unlike some other fiddler crabs, females also wave their claws in addition to males. These crabs mate on the surface rather than in burrows.
