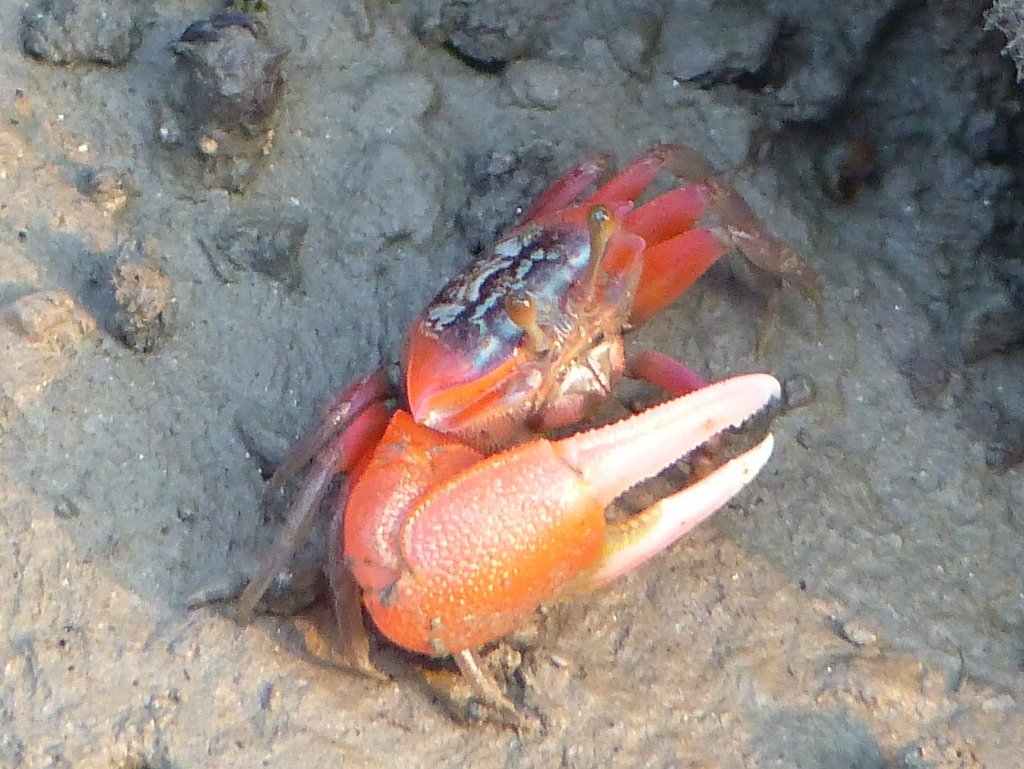

Scientific classification
- Kingdom: Animalia
- Phylum: Arthropoda
- Class: Malacostraca
- Order: Decapoda
- Suborder: Pleocyemata
- Infraorder: Brachyura
- Family: Ocypodidae
- Subfamily: Gelasiminae
- Genus: Tubuca
- Species: T. rosea

Binomial name
- Tubuca rosea (Tweedie, 1937)

= Tubuca rosea =

Species of crab

Tubuca rosea, also known by its common name rose fiddler crab, is a species of crab from the genus Tubuca.
