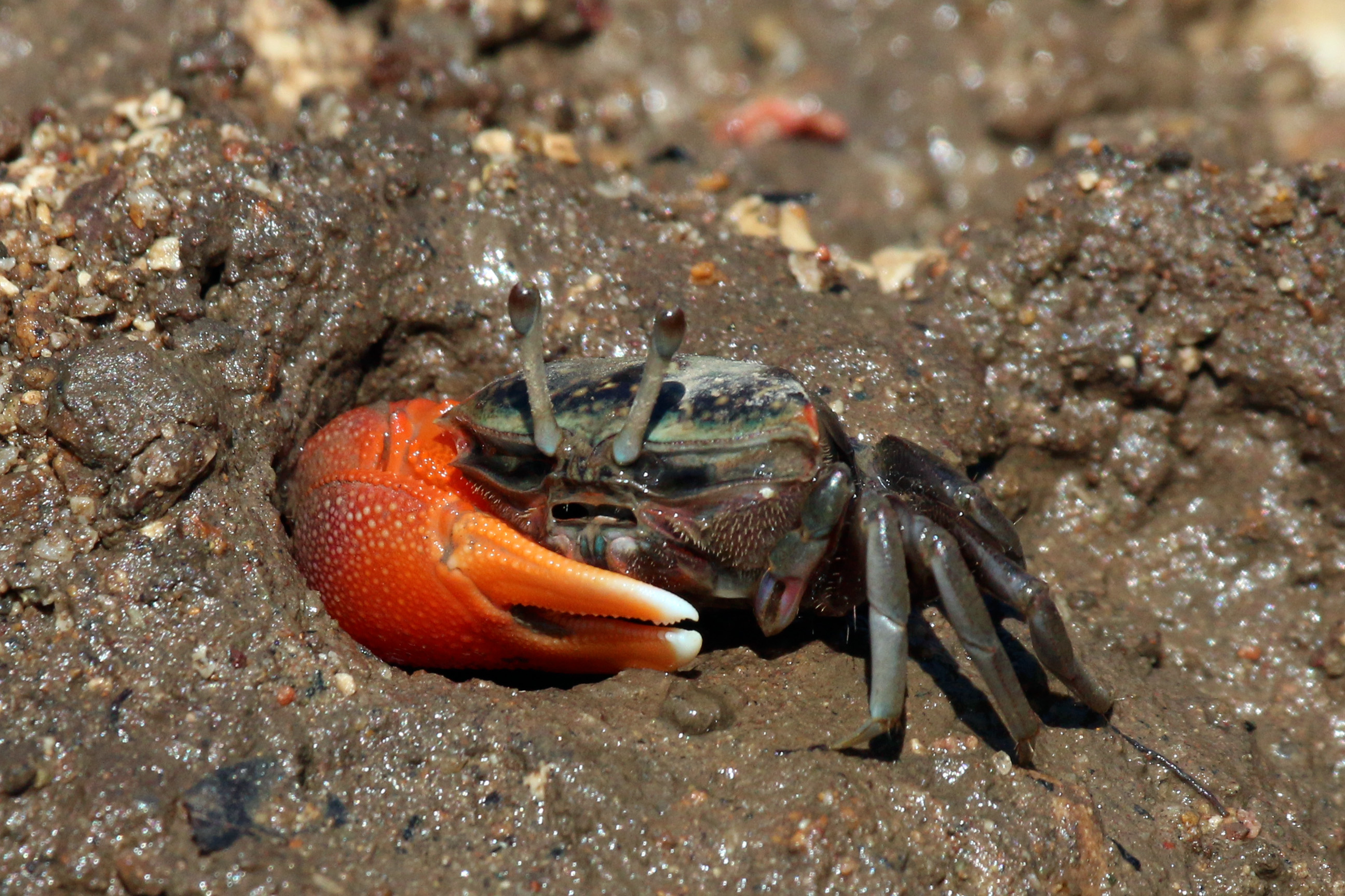

Scientific classification
- Kingdom: Animalia
- Phylum: Arthropoda
- Class: Malacostraca
- Order: Decapoda
- Suborder: Pleocyemata
- Infraorder: Brachyura
- Family: Ocypodidae
- Subfamily: Gelasiminae
- Genus: Tubuca
- Species: T. coarctata

Binomial name
- Tubuca coarctata (H. Milne Edwards, 1852)

= Tubuca coarctata =

Compressed fiddler crab

Species of fiddler crab

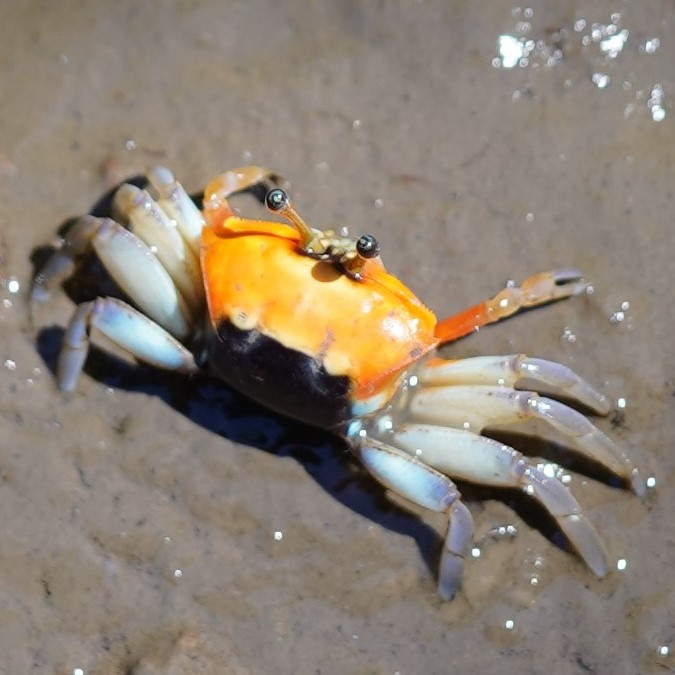
Tubuca coarctata

Tubuca coarctata is a species of fiddler crab found in the western Pacific ocean, including Japan, Taiwan, the Philippines, Indonesia, New Guinea and Australia (in Queensland and the Northern Territory). The common name of these crabs is either the compressed fiddler crab, or the orange-clawed fiddler crab, (although this name is also used for Gelasimus vomeris). They are found on tidal mud flats adjacent mangroves and muddy tidal creek and river banks.

These are medium sized fiddler crabs with a carapace of males around 21 mm across. The clawed limb of adult males is in general orange or light brown with the color continuing onto the top and bottom fingers of the claw and fading to white at the ends. Sources from Australia refer to adult males having a white spot at the back of the last walking leg. The color of the carapace is variable however typical coloring for adult males is mostly black on the back with white or yellow or blue markings. A hook like projection at the end of the upper claw is present in males. A difference to Tubuca dussiemeri (which also has red-orange coloration on the adult male claw) is that there is one rather than two grooves in the claw. The carapace of adult females is also typically black with either small yellow markings or blue markings or sometimes orange. Juvenile males have a blue carapace with black markings and juvenile females either orange or blue with black markings similar to males.

Tubuca coarctata was formerly a member of the genus Uca, but in 2016 it was placed in the genus Tubuca, a former subgenus of Uca.
