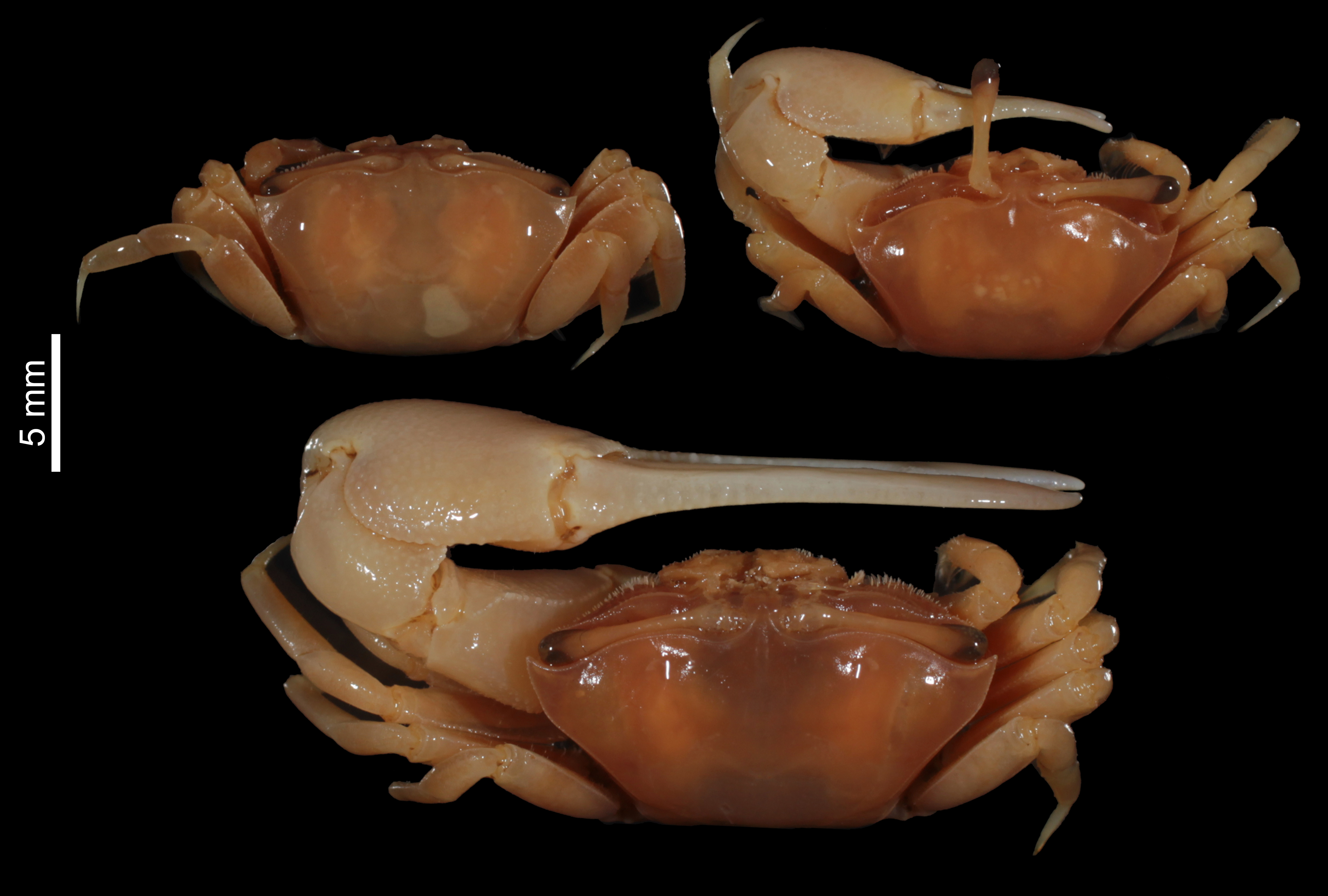
- Tubuca bellator

Scientific classification
- Domain: Eukaryota
- Kingdom: Animalia
- Phylum: Arthropoda
- Class: Malacostraca
- Order: Decapoda
- Suborder: Pleocyemata
- Infraorder: Brachyura
- Family: Ocypodidae
- Subfamily: Gelasiminae
- Tribe: Gelasimini
- Genus: Tubuca; Bott, 1973

= Tubuca =

Genus of crabs

Tubuca is a genus in Ocypodidae, a family of fiddler and ghost crabs. There are more than 20 described species in Tubuca.

== Species ==
Tubuca contains the following species:

- Tubuca acuta (Stimpson, 1858)
- Tubuca alcocki Shih, Chan & Ng, 2018
- Tubuca arcuata (De Haan, 1835)
- Tubuca australiae (Crane, 1975)
- Tubuca bellator (White, 1847)
- Tubuca capricornis (Crane, 1975)
- Tubuca coarctata (H.Milne Edwards, 1852)
- Tubuca demani (Ortmann, 1897)
- Tubuca dussumieri (H.Milne Edwards, 1852)
- Tubuca elegans (George & Jones, 1982)
- Tubuca flammula (Crane, 1975)
- Tubuca forcipata (Adams & White, 1849)
- Tubuca hirsutimanus (George & Jones, 1982)
- Tubuca longidigitum (Kingsley, 1880)
- Tubuca paradussumieri (Bott, 1973)
- Tubuca polita (Crane, 1975)
- Tubuca rhizophorae (Tweedie, 1950)
- Tubuca rosea (Tweedie, 1937)
- Tubuca seismella (Crane, 1975)
- Tubuca signata (Hess, 1865)
- Tubuca typhoni (Crane, 1975)
- Tubuca urvillei (H.Milne Edwards, 1852)
