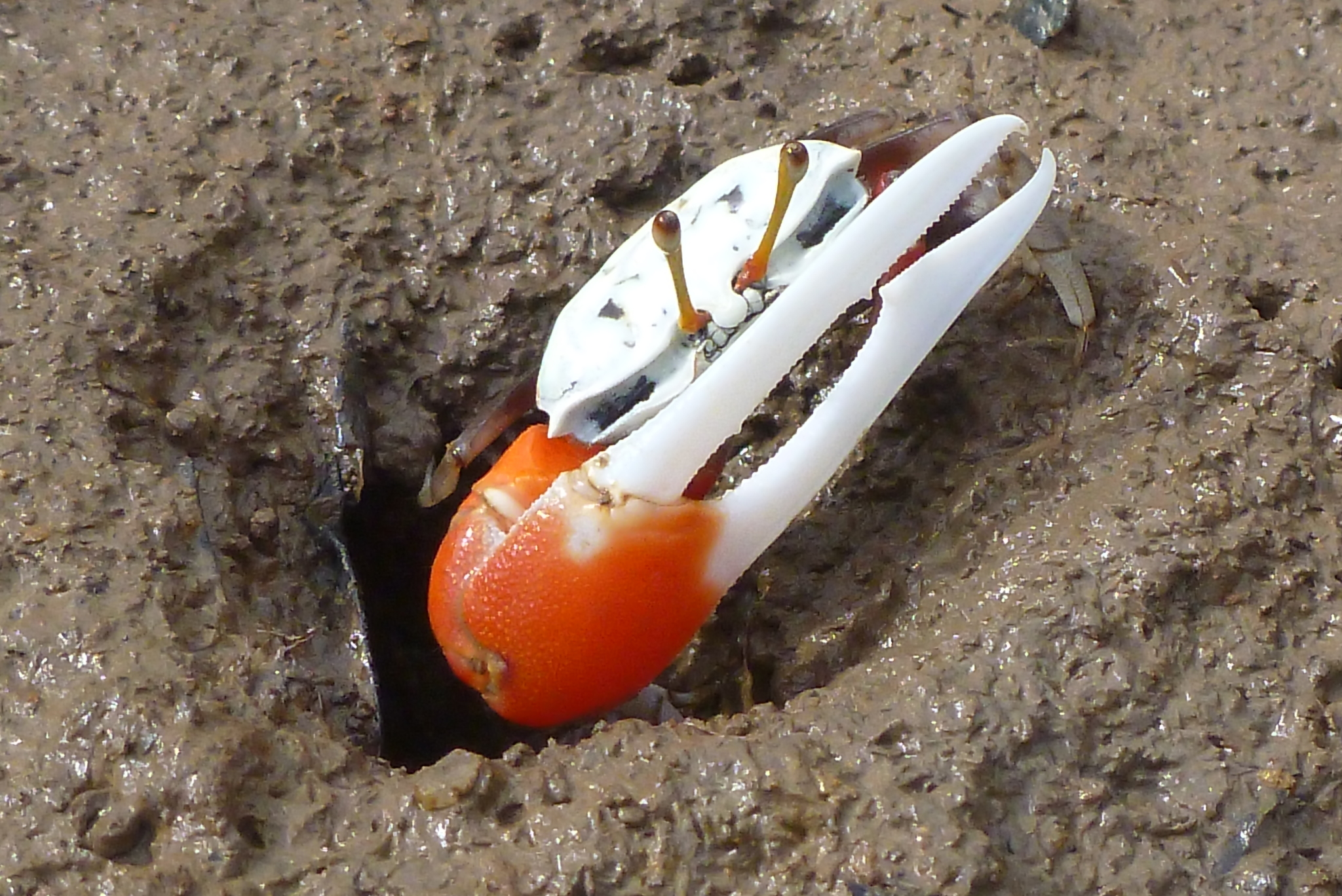

Scientific classification
- Kingdom: Animalia
- Phylum: Arthropoda
- Class: Malacostraca
- Order: Decapoda
- Suborder: Pleocyemata
- Infraorder: Brachyura
- Family: Ocypodidae
- Subfamily: Gelasiminae
- Genus: Tubuca
- Species: T. signata

Binomial name
- Tubuca signata (Hess, 1865)

= Tubuca signata =

Species of crabs

Tubuca signata, the signalling fiddler crab, is a species of fiddler crab that is found in Australia from Queensland to northwestern Australia.

== Description ==
Tubuca signata males have one claw that is significantly larger than the other, while females have two equal-sized smaller claws. The male adult upper claw (pollex) is smooth and bright white while the lower claw (dactyl) has a single groove along its length. The wrist (manus) is red. The male carapace is typically up to 17 mm wide (95% of individuals are this size or smaller), with females slightly smaller.
