= Baihe Taiwan Film and TV Town =

Former theme park in Baihe, Tainan, Taiwan

Coordinates: 23°18′56″N 120°26′42″E

- 白河台灣電影文化城
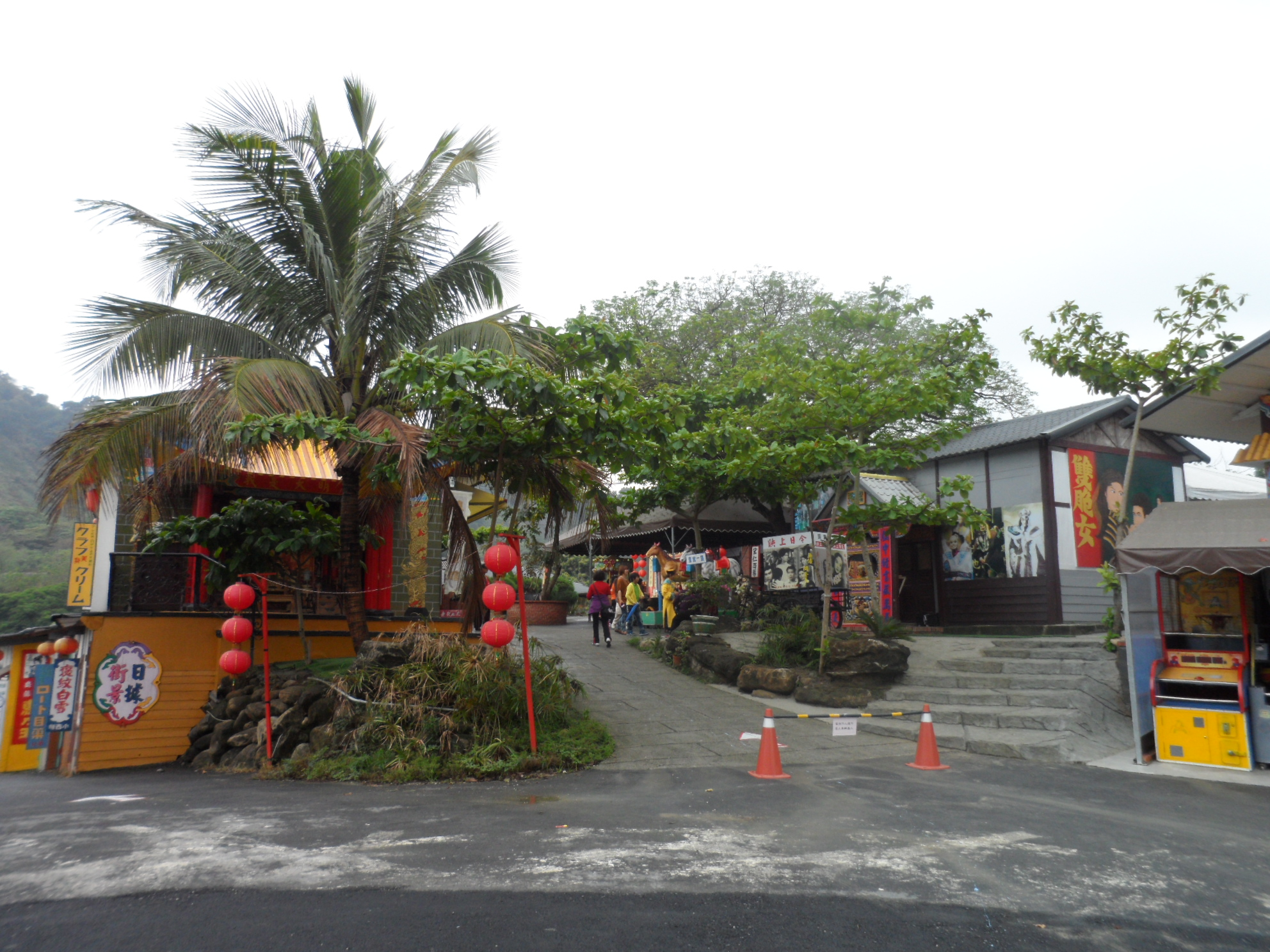
- Interactive map of the Baihe Taiwan Film and TV Town area

General information
- Type: theme park
- Location: Baihe, Tainan, Taiwan

Technical details
- Floor count: 35 hectares

Website
- movie.okgo.tw

The Baihe Taiwan Film and TV Town (traditional Chinese: 白河台灣電影文化城; simplified Chinese: 白河台湾电影文化城; pinyin: Báihé Táiwān Diànyǐng Wénhuà Chéng) was a theme park in Baihe District, Tainan, Taiwan. The park ceased operations in 2017.

== See also ==
- List of tourist attractions in Taiwan
