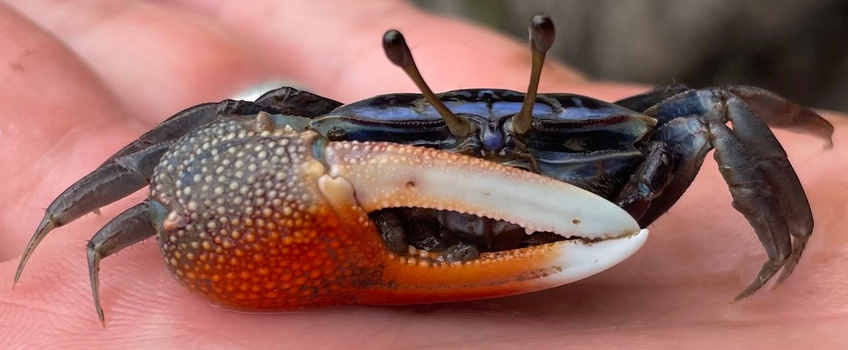
- Male T. urvillei

Scientific classification
- Domain: Eukaryota
- Kingdom: Animalia
- Phylum: Arthropoda
- Class: Malacostraca
- Order: Decapoda
- Suborder: Pleocyemata
- Infraorder: Brachyura
- Family: Ocypodidae
- Subfamily: Gelasiminae
- Genus: Tubuca
- Species: T. urvillei

Binomial name
- Tubuca urvillei (H. Milne Edwards, 1852)

Synonyms
- Gelasimus arcuatus Krauss 1843; Gelasimus dussumieri A. Milne-Edwards 1868; Uca arcuata Stebbing 1905; Uca arcuatus Stebbing 1917; Uca dussumieri Maccagno 1928; Uca urvillei Barnard 1950; Tubuca urvillei Bott 1973; Uca (Uca) dussumieri Hartnoll 1975; Uca (Uca) urvillei Hartnoll 1975; Uca (Deltuca) [coarctata] urvillei Crane 1975; Uca (Deltuca) urvillei Vannini and Valmori 1981; Uca (Tubuca) urvillei Bouchard et al. 2013

= Tubuca urvillei =

Species of crab

Tubuca urvillei is a species of fiddler crab. It is found in Southeastern Africa from southern Somalia to South Africa and Madagascar.

Tubuca urvillei was formerly a member of the genus Uca, but in 2016, it was placed in the genus Tubuca, a former subgenus of Uca.

== Description ==
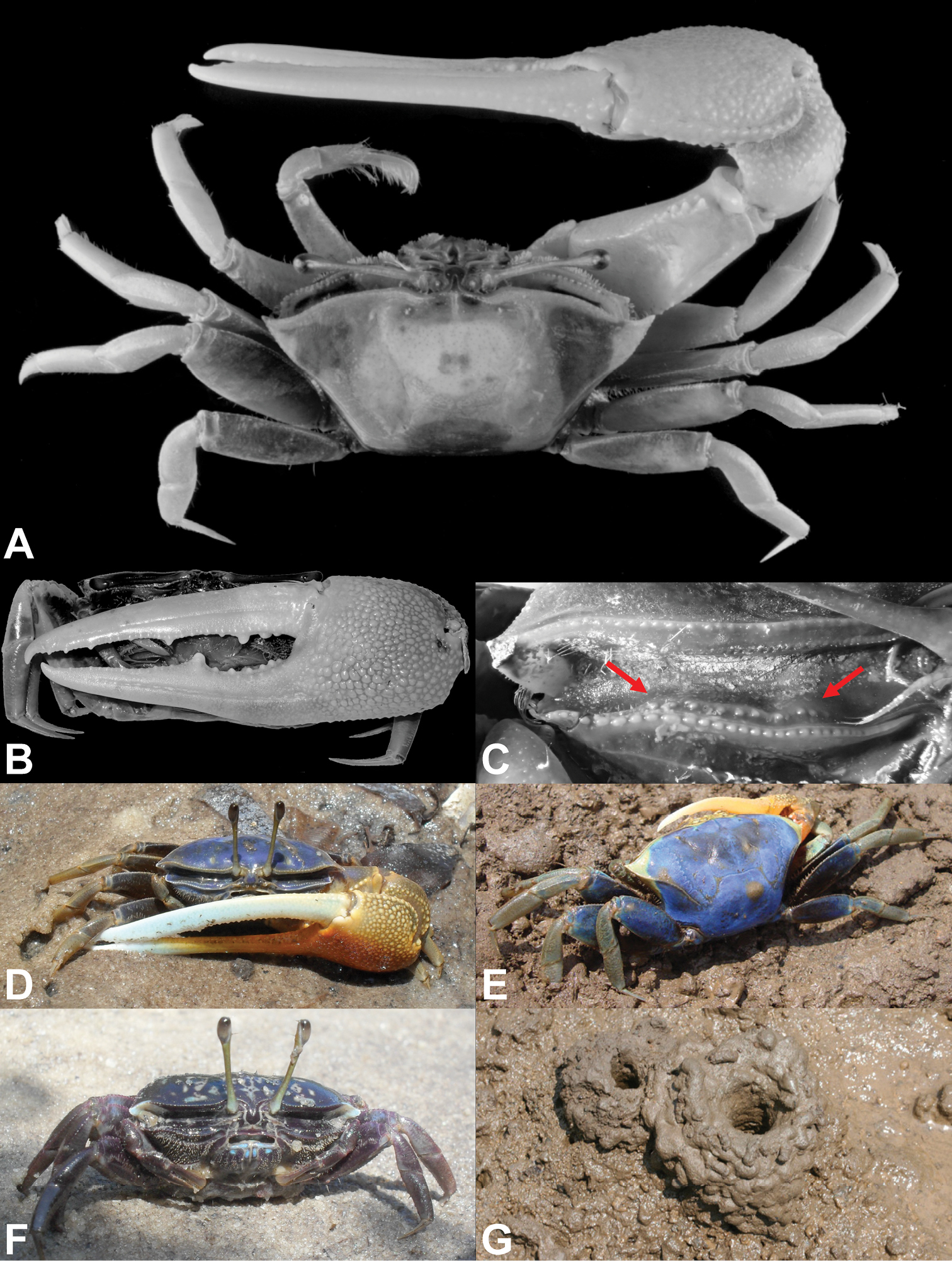
Figure of T. urvillei

The carapace of a male is broadly triangular and directed laterally. The anterolateral margin is short and slightly long. The major cheliped with dactylus is usually longer than palm. The carapace of female is acutely triangular. The anterolateral margin was absent.
