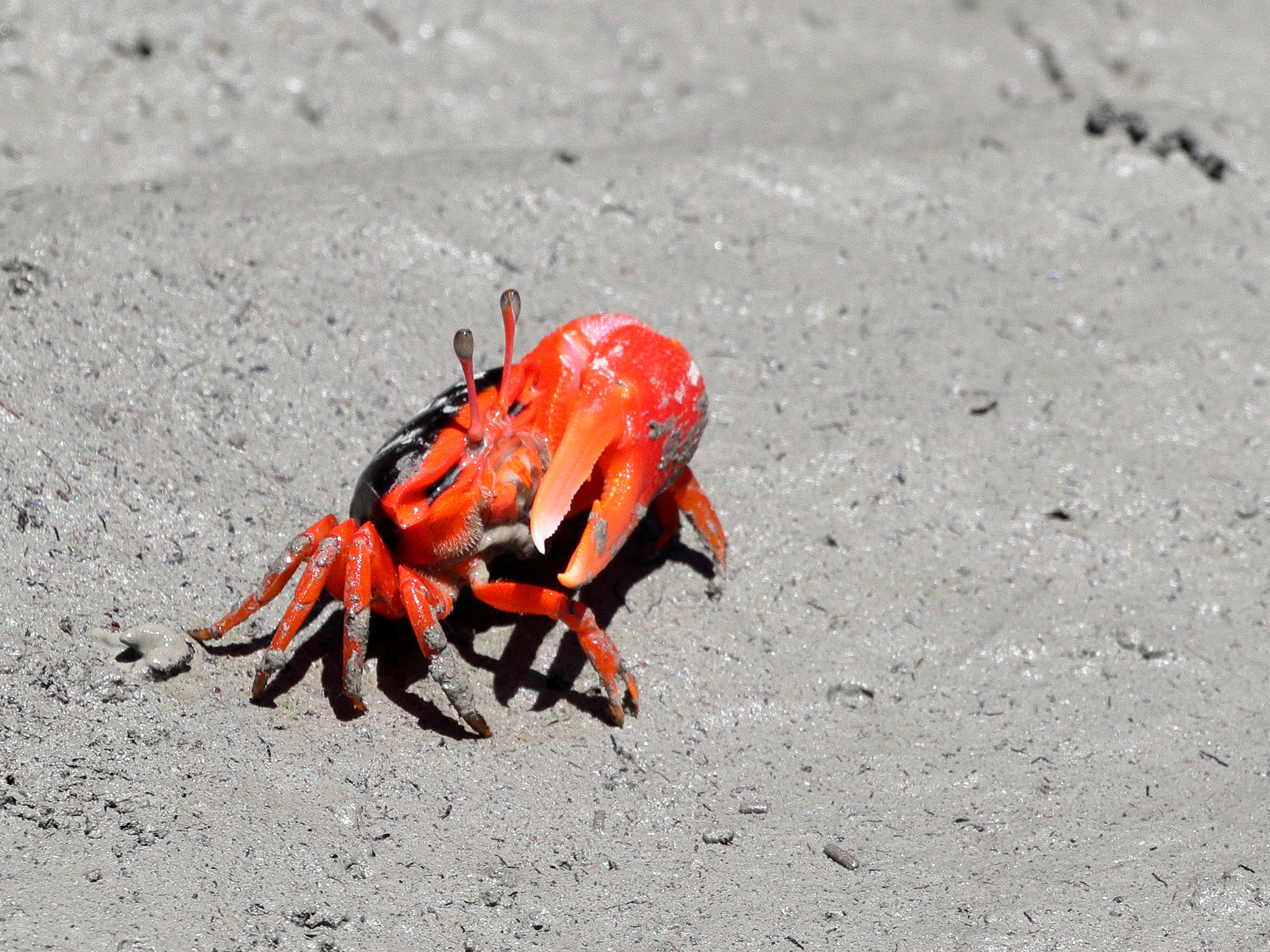

Scientific classification
- Kingdom: Animalia
- Phylum: Arthropoda
- Class: Malacostraca
- Order: Decapoda
- Suborder: Pleocyemata
- Infraorder: Brachyura
- Family: Ocypodidae
- Subfamily: Gelasiminae
- Genus: Tubuca
- Species: T. flammula

Binomial name
- Tubuca flammula (Crane, 1975)

= Tubuca flammula =

Species of crab

Tubuca flammula, commonly known as the flame-backed fiddler crab is a species of fiddler crab that is found in the northwest of Western Australia, the northern part of the Northern Territory and the western half of Papua New Guinea

Tubuca flammula was formerly a member of the genus Uca, but in 2016 it was placed in the genus Tubuca, a former subgenus of Uca.

== Description ==
Like other fiddler crabs, Tubuca flammula males have one claw that is significantly larger than the other, while females have two equal-sized smaller claws. It has a black carapace with two white or pinkish parallel marks running fore, and aft near the centre and a solid red band across the front of the carapace. The claws are bright red-orange and the eyes are close together.
