= Baihe District =

District in Tainan, Taiwan

Coordinates: 23°20′1.09″N 120°27′31.7″E

Baihe 白河區 Shirakawa
- District
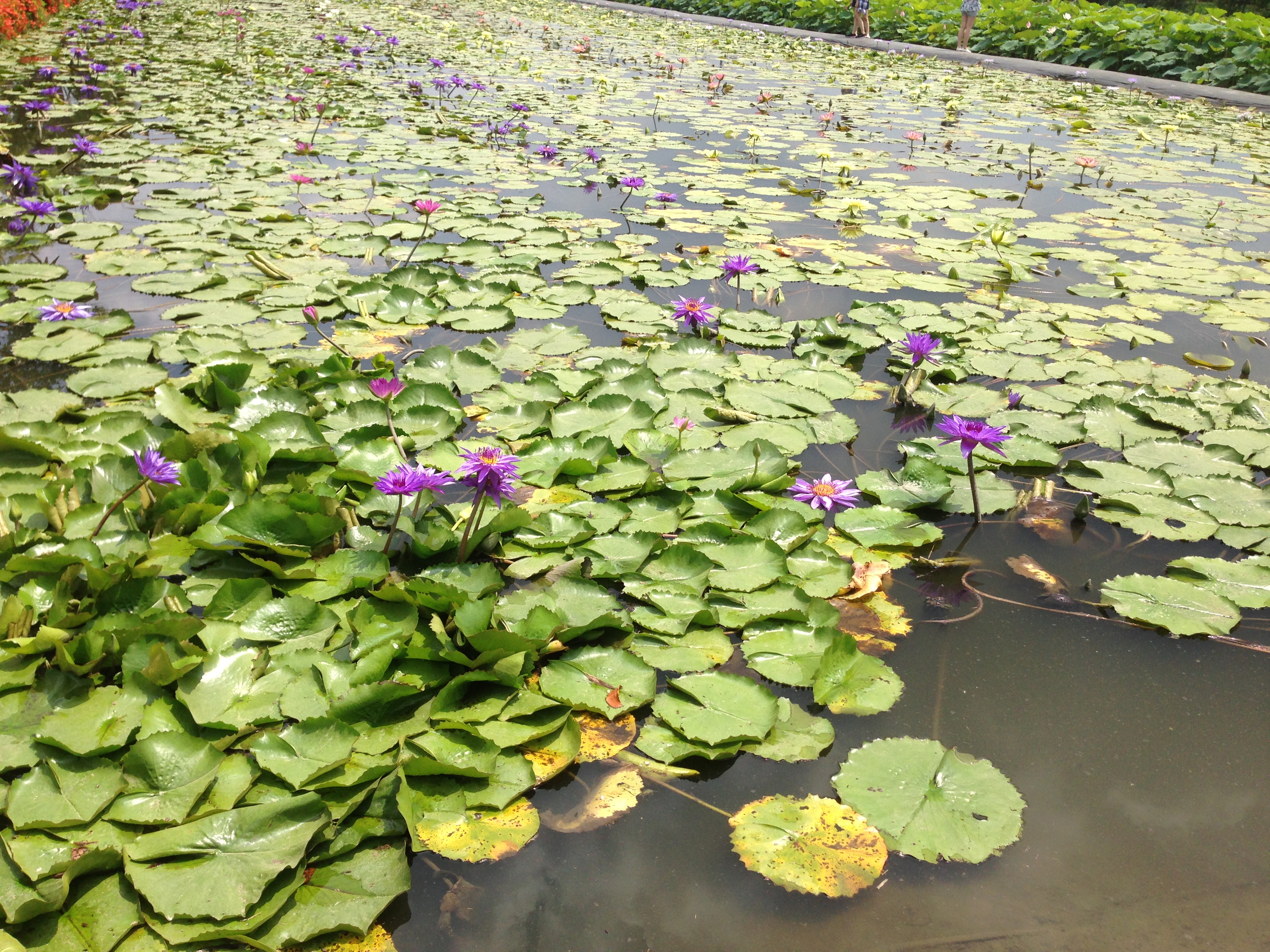
- Lotus pond in Baihe

- Baihe District in Tainan City
- Location: Tainan, Taiwan

Area
  - Total: 126 km^{2} (49 sq mi)

Population (March 2023)
  - Total: 26,198
  - Density: 208/km^{2} (539/sq mi)
- Website: baihe.tainan.gov.tw/en/

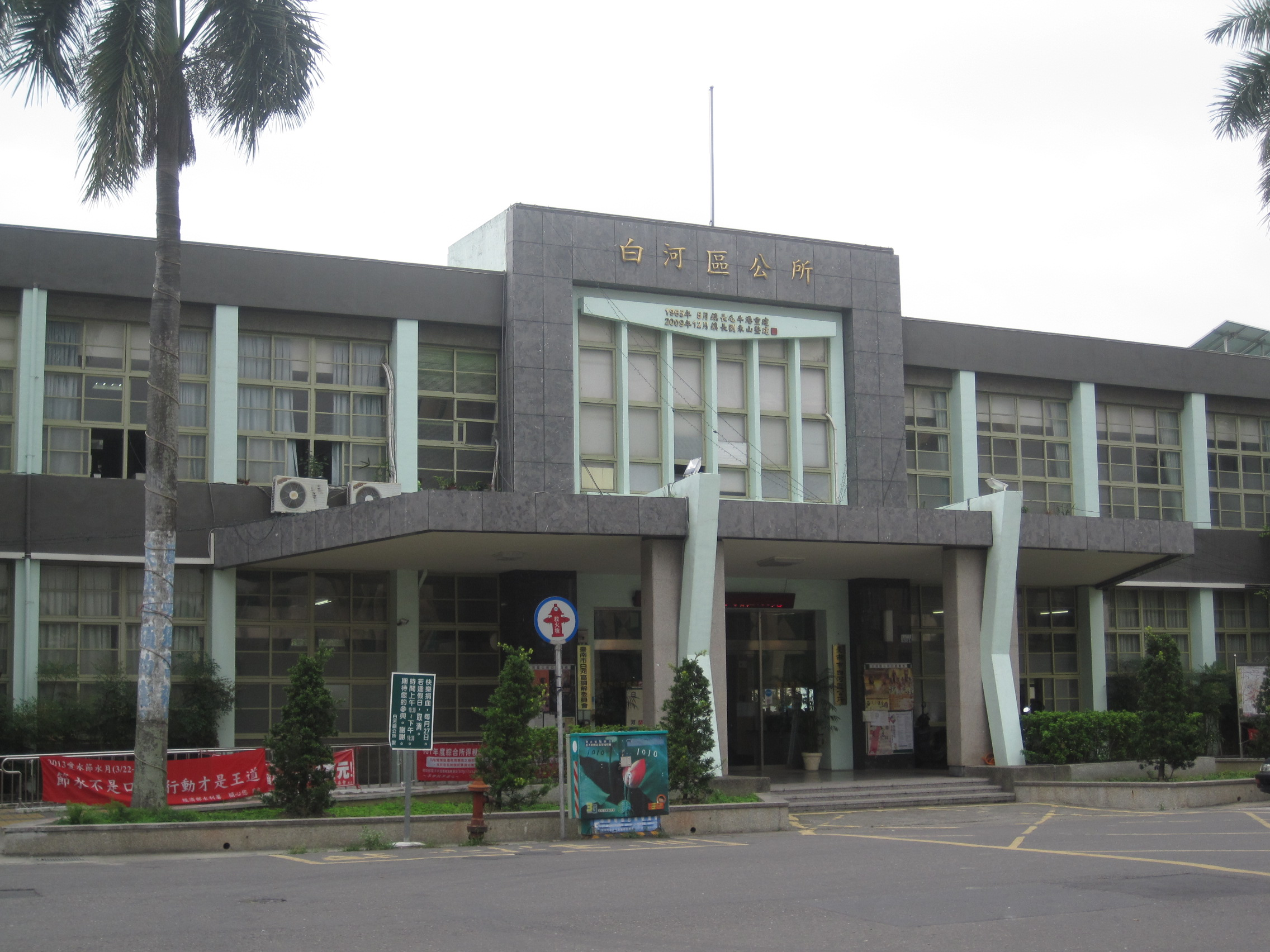
Baihe District Office

Baihe District (Chinese: 白河區; pinyin: Báihé Qū; Wade–Giles: Pai^{2}-ho^{2} Ch'ü^{1}; Pe̍h-ōe-jī: Pe̍h-hô-khu) is a district located in Tainan, Taiwan. It is known for its hot springs and lotus farming. The town borders Chiayi County to the north and east, Dongshan District to the south, and Houbi District to the west. Some indigenous Siraya people live here, although their lifestyles and traditions have been almost replaced (or perhaps absorbed) by Han Chinese culture.

== History ==
In 1875, Scottish missionary William Campbell made a narrow escape from an attack led by Gaw-chi-ko (吳志高), a wealthy local clan head opposed to the establishment of the foreign church. At the time, the place was a market-town called Tiam-a-khau (店仔口; Pe̍h-ōe-jī: Tiàm-á-kháu) and was five miles west of their chapel.

After the handover of Taiwan from Japan to the Republic of China in 1945, Baihe was organized as an urban township of Tainan County. On 25 December 2010, Tainan County was merged with Tainan City and Baihe was upgraded to a district of the city.

== Administrative divisions ==
Baihe, Yongan, Waijiao, Zhuangnei, Xiuyou, Hetung, Hushan, Dalin, Kantou, Liuxi, Guanling, Xiancao, Yufeng, Dazhu, Zhaoan, Guangan, Liantan, Zhumen, Qinei, Shengan, Biantou, Neijiao, Caodian and Ganzhai Village.

== Tourist attractions ==
- 49 Thicket
- Baihe Lotus Park (白河蓮花公園)
- Baihe Night Market
- Baihe Reservoir
- Guangji Temple Hua'an Shrine
- Guanziling Hot Spring
- Lotus Park
- Small South China Sea Scenic Area
- Zhumen Green Tunnel

The district was formerly home to the Baihe Taiwan Film and TV Town, which closed in 2017.

== Transportation ==
Baihe is served by Freeway 3, and City Routes 165, 172, 172A, and 172B.
