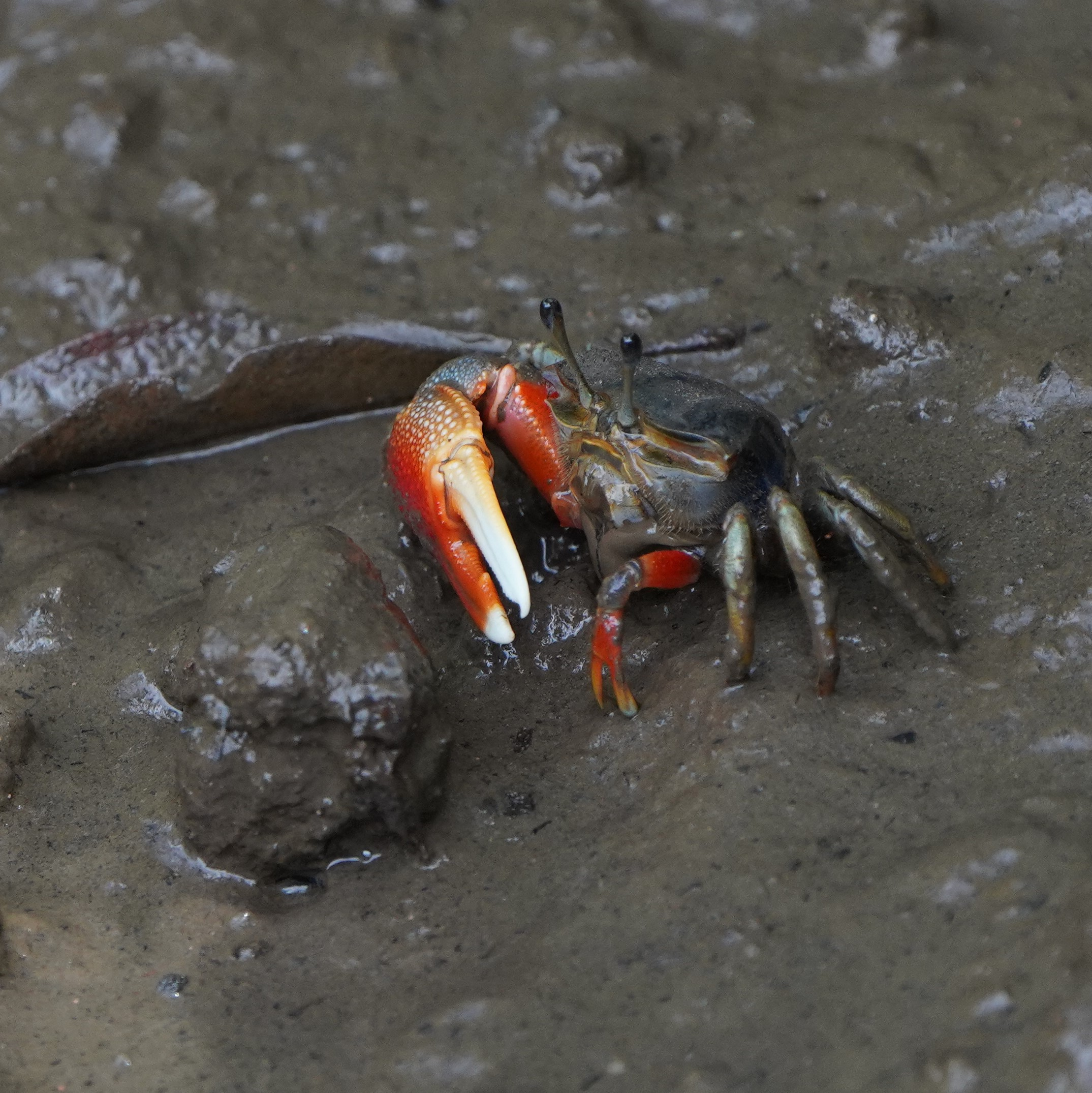

Scientific classification
- Domain: Eukaryota
- Kingdom: Animalia
- Phylum: Arthropoda
- Class: Malacostraca
- Order: Decapoda
- Suborder: Pleocyemata
- Infraorder: Brachyura
- Family: Ocypodidae
- Subfamily: Gelasiminae
- Genus: Tubuca
- Species: T. dussumieri

Binomial name
- Tubuca dussumieri (H. Milne Edwards, 1852)

= Tubuca dussumieri =

Species of crab

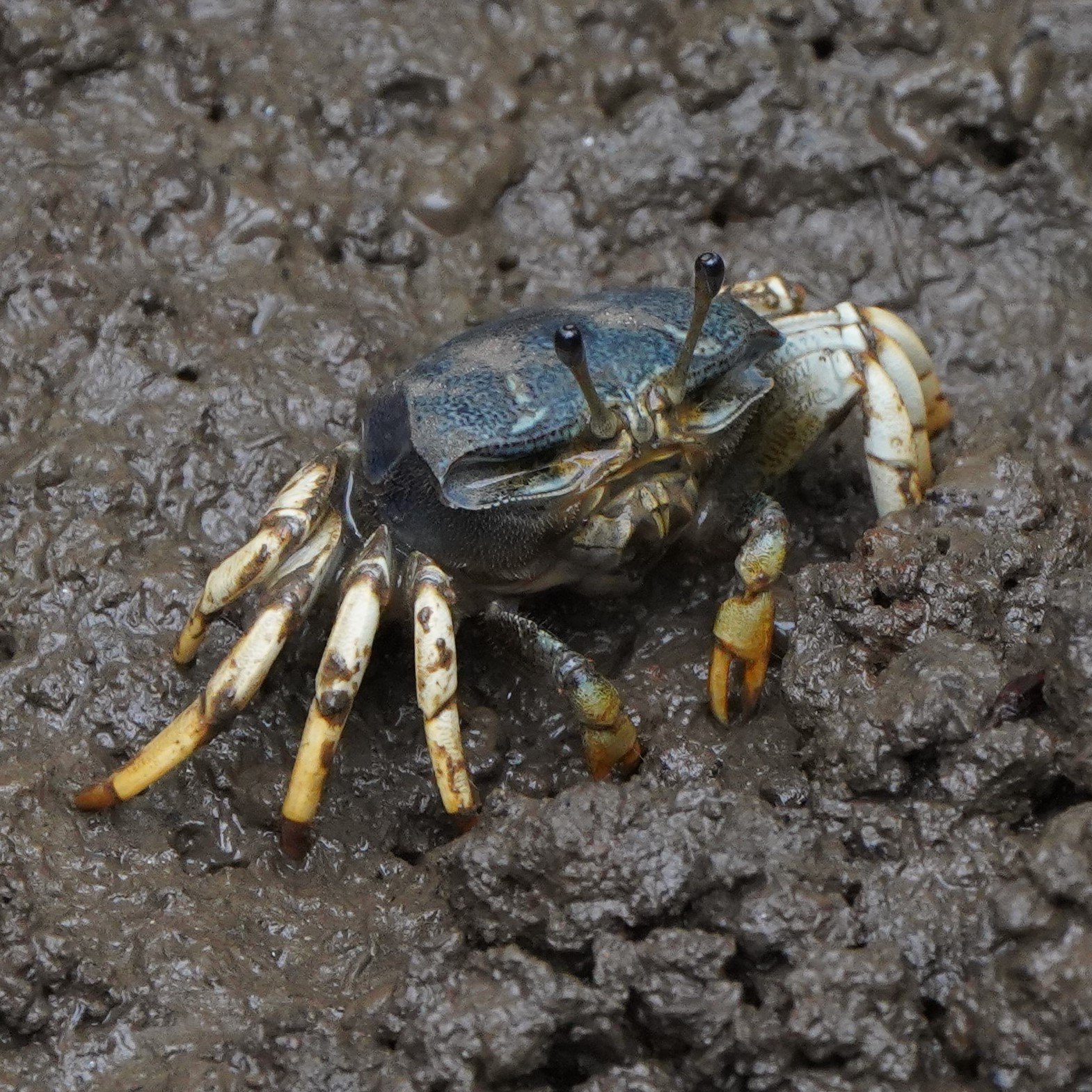
Tubuca dussumieri

Tubuca dussumieri is a species of fiddler crab that is found in the western and south Pacific including New Caledonia, Indonesia, Malaysia, Taiwan, Japan, and northeastern Australia.

== Description ==
Tubuca dussumieri males have one claw that is significantly larger than the other, while females have two equal-sized smaller claws. It has a blue-black carapace. The male claw is red or orange on the lower half and white to yellow on the upper half, with granules on the wrist and a gutter along the lower claw. The width of the carapace is up to around 33 mm. In Australia, it can be distinguished from Tubuca coarctata as the upper upper movable finger of the claw of Tubuca dussumieri is white or yellow white with the lower finger mostly orange and the wrist (manus) blue-grey, and that there is two rather than one grooves in the upper claw.

Tubuca dussumieri was formerly a member of the genus Uca, but in 2016 it was placed in the genus Tubuca, a former subgenus of Uca.
