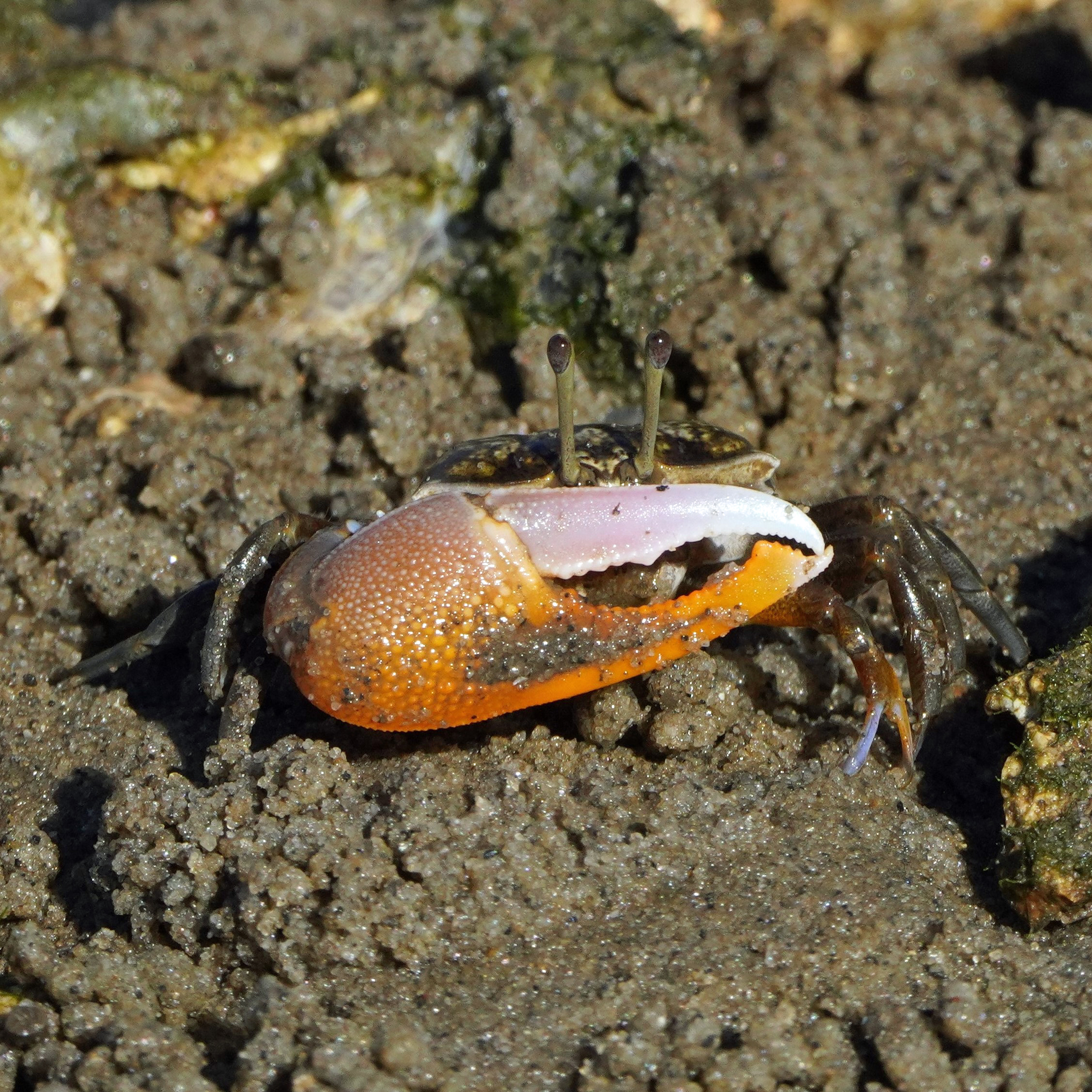

Scientific classification
- Domain: Eukaryota
- Kingdom: Animalia
- Phylum: Arthropoda
- Class: Malacostraca
- Order: Decapoda
- Suborder: Pleocyemata
- Infraorder: Brachyura
- Family: Ocypodidae
- Subfamily: Gelasiminae
- Genus: Gelasimus
- Species: G. vomeris

Binomial name
- Gelasimus vomeris (McNeill, 1920)

= Gelasimus vomeris =

Two-toned fiddler crab

Species of crab

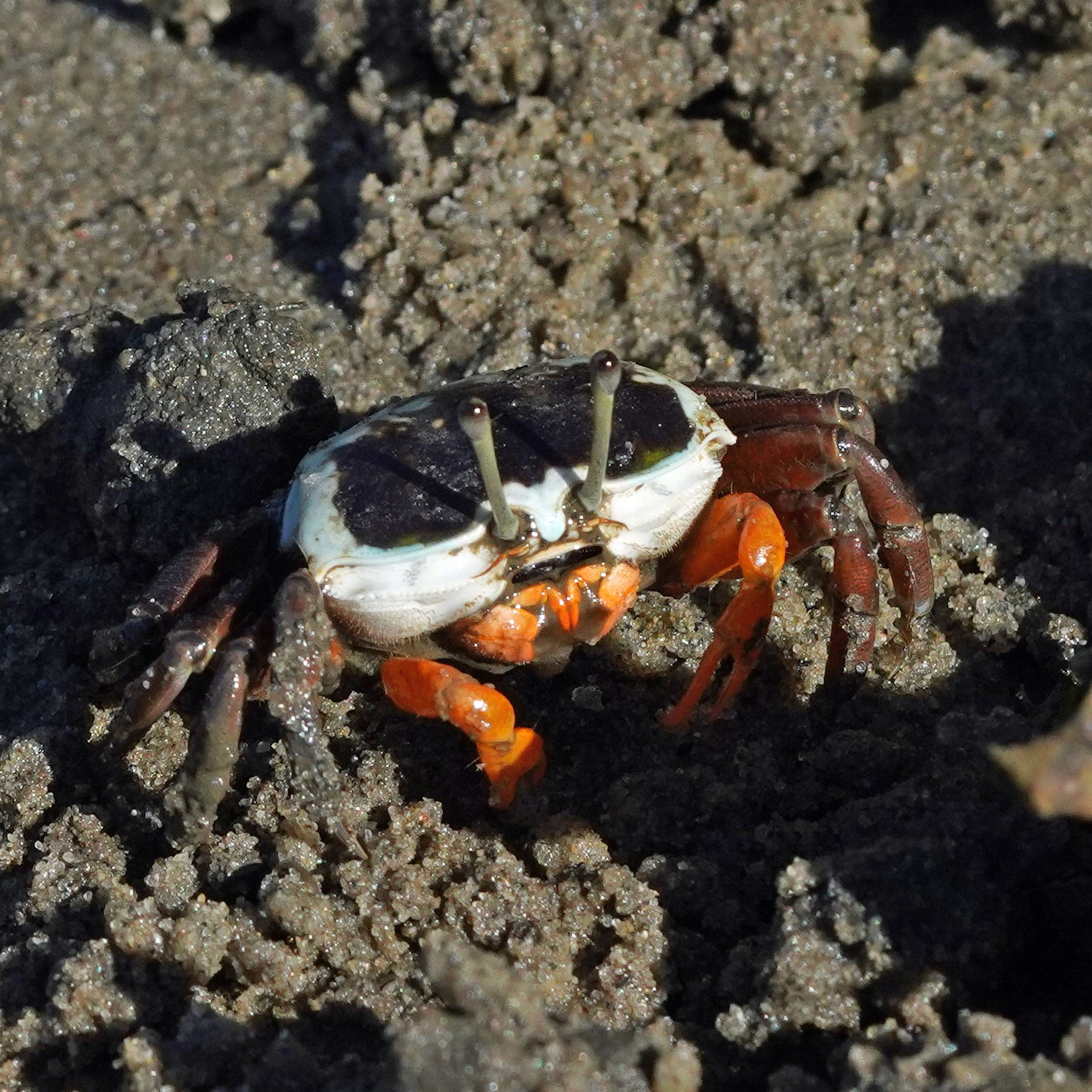
Gelasimus vomeris female

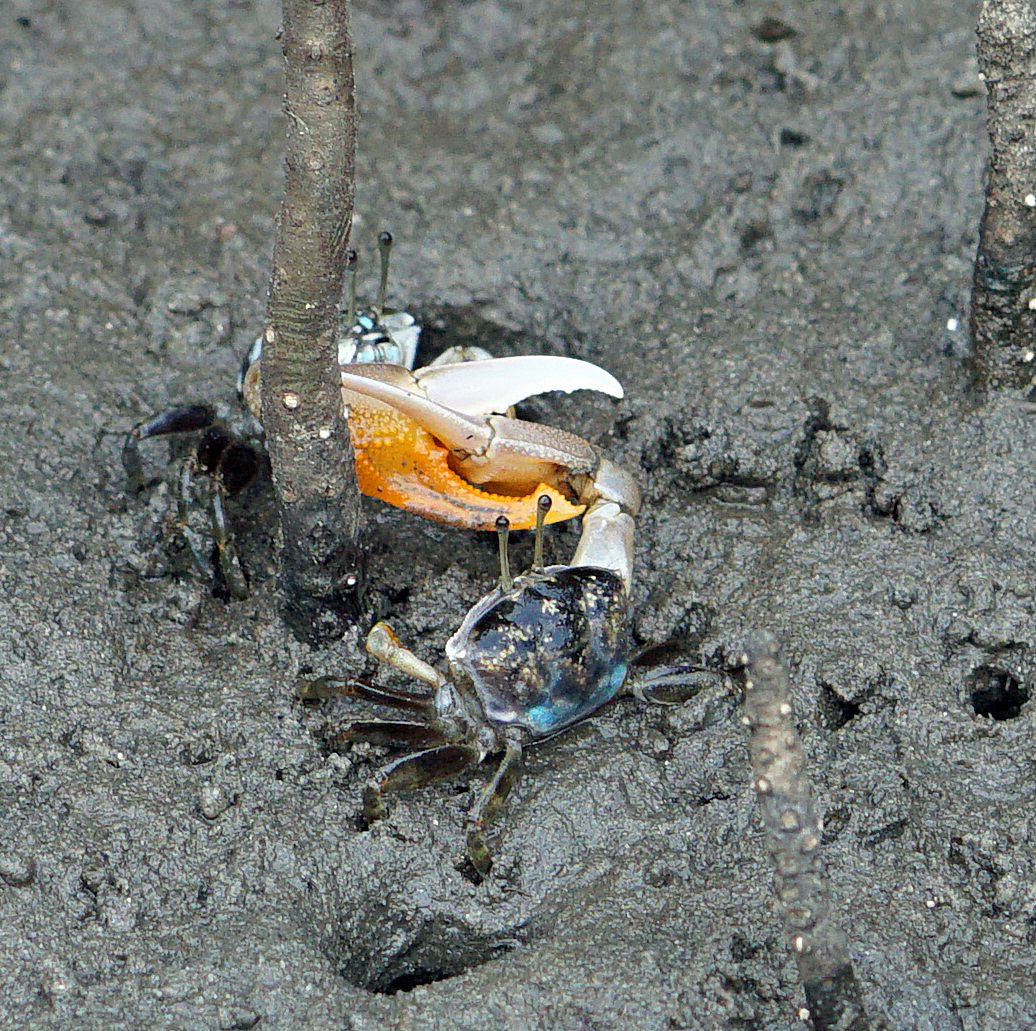
Gelasimus vomeris males fighting

Gelasimus vomeris is a species of fiddler crab found in the southwest Pacific Ocean. In Australia, it is found in the east and north from Darwin to Sydney.

It is commonly known as the two-toned fiddler crab, orange-clawed fiddler crab or Southern calling fiddler crab, however the common name orange-clawed fiddler crab is also used for the fiddler crab Tubuca coarctata. Previous binomial names include Uca vomeris and Uca vocans vomeris.

== Description ==
The carapace is up to 30 mm across, black-brown with blue patches to varying extent. Adult males have an enlarged claw with a grey or pink upper finger, and orange lower finger and hand. Like other fiddler crabs the claw is used to scare or fight other males, and in waving displays to attract females. The lower male claw has a large triangular protection in the most distant part from the body.

If caught, the colors of Gelasimus vomeris crabs will become less brilliant within minutes, and in response to the presence of predators in an area, the blue color of these fiddler crabs will change over a few days to a dull muddy brown.

== Distribution and habitat ==
The preferred habitat of these crabs is unshaded sandy mud. They are found in bays, estuaries and creeks, living in burrows at lower tide levels which they stay close to, typically <1 m while feeding. There is a predominance of right handed individuals in colonies, one study finding left handed individuals forming only 1.4% of the study population.
