= Baihe Reservoir =

Reservoir in Baihe, Tainan, Taiwan

- 白河水庫 (Chinese)
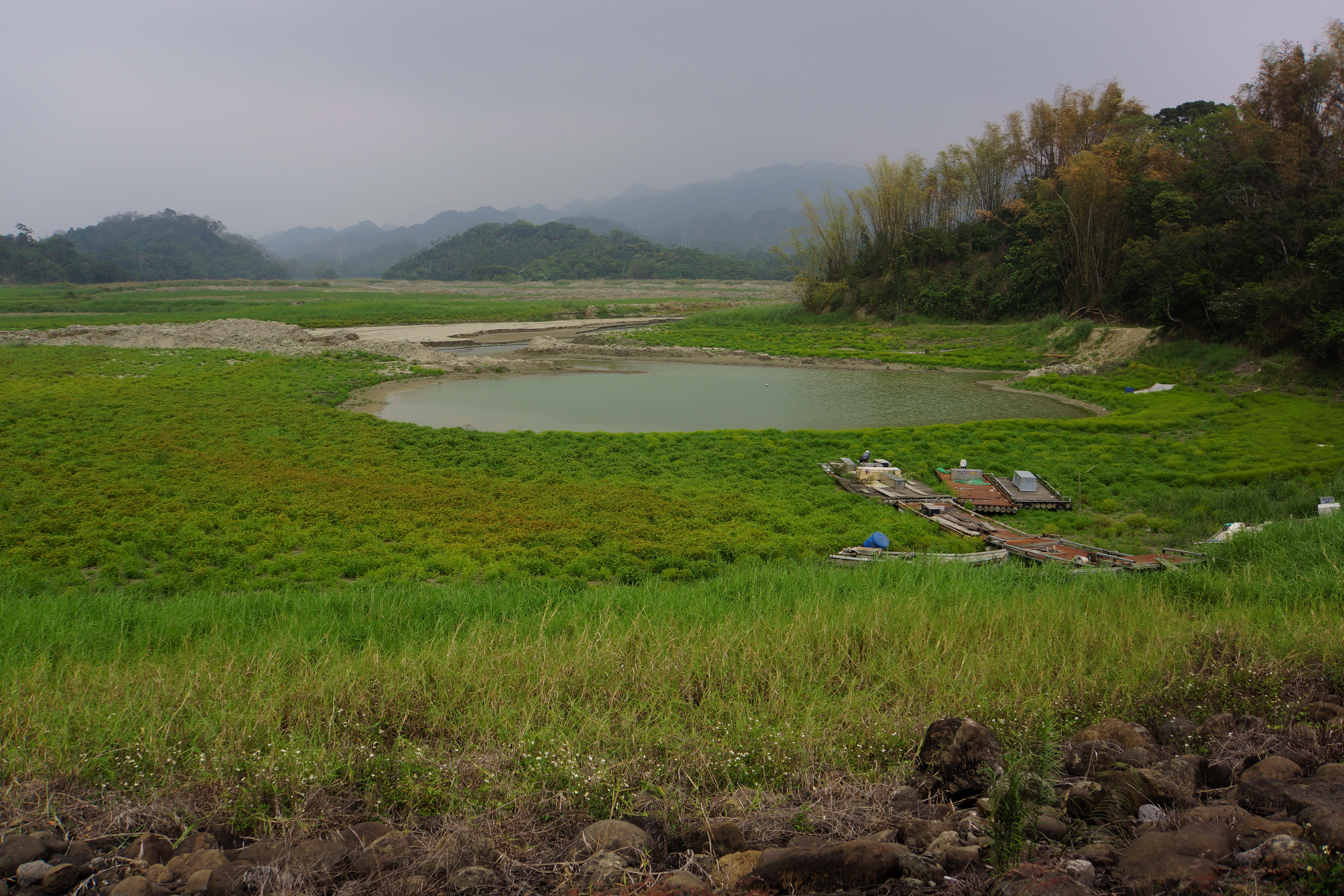

- Location within Tainan
- Location: Baihe, Tainan, Taiwan
- Coordinates: 23°21′43.2″N 120°29′03.4″E
- Type: reservoir
- Built: 1965
- Water volume: 9,690,000 m^{3} (7,860 acre⋅ft)

The Baihe Reservoir (traditional Chinese: 白河水庫; simplified Chinese: 白河水库; pinyin: Báihé Shuǐkù) is a reservoir in Baihe District, Tainan, Taiwan.

== History ==
The reservoir was constructed in 1965. During the drought in early 2021, the reservoir became completely dry in March-April. In June 2021, a discharge warning was issued for the dam.

== Technical specifications ==
The reservoir has an effective capacity of 9,690,000 m^{3}.

== See also ==
- List of dams and reservoirs in Taiwan
