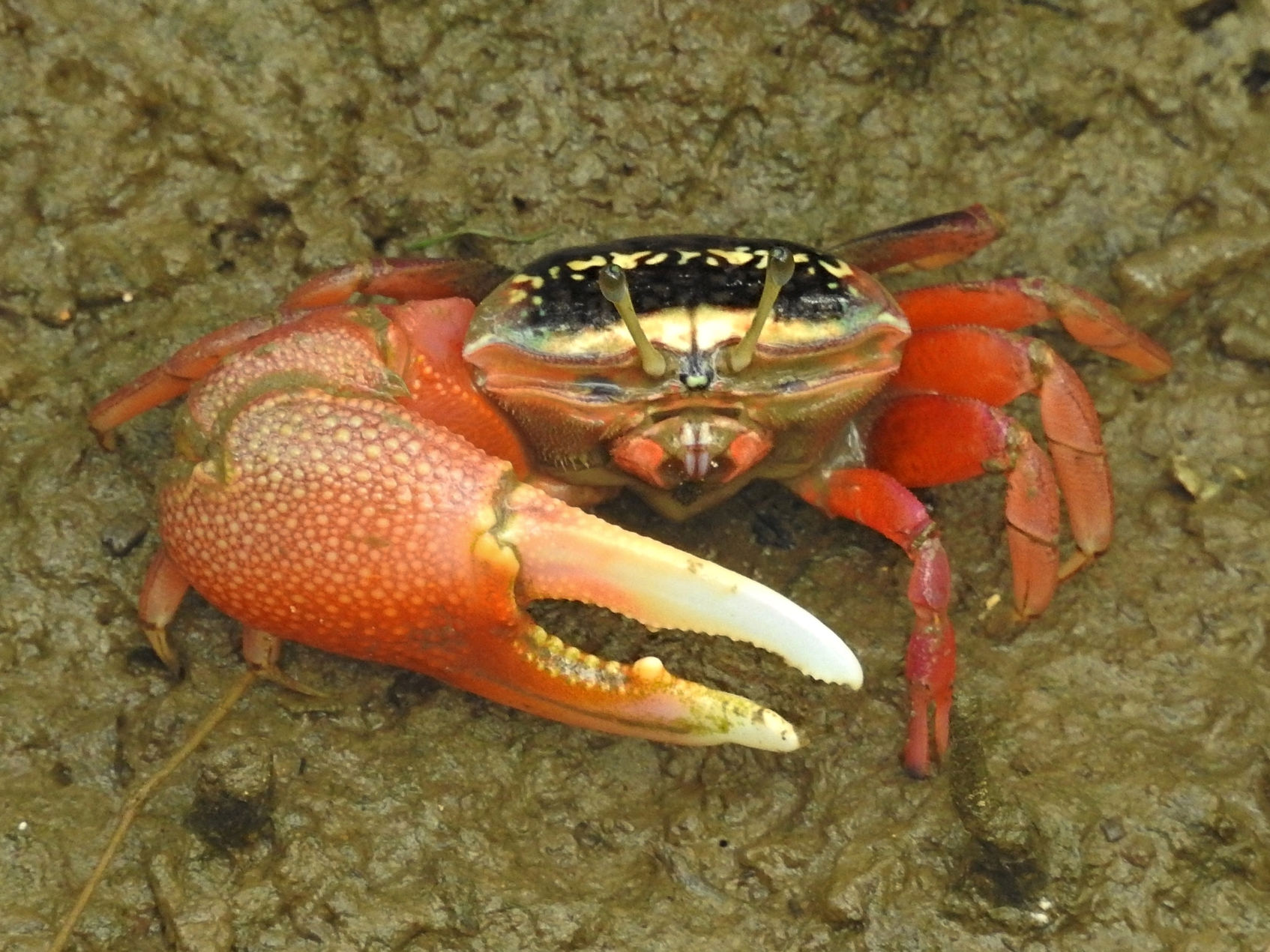
- Adult seen in Hong Kong

Scientific classification
- Domain: Eukaryota
- Kingdom: Animalia
- Phylum: Arthropoda
- Class: Malacostraca
- Order: Decapoda
- Suborder: Pleocyemata
- Infraorder: Brachyura
- Family: Ocypodidae
- Subfamily: Gelasiminae
- Genus: Tubuca
- Species: T. arcuata

Binomial name
- Tubuca arcuata (De Haan, 1835)

= Tubuca arcuata =

Species of crab

Tubuca arcuata, the bowed fiddler crab, is a species of fiddler crab in the family Ocypodidae. It can be found in China, Taiwan, Korea, and Japan.

== Size ==
Large carapace breadth: 25.3 mm ± 5.84 (sd), 95% range: 13.9–36.8 mm
