= P. granulosa =

P. granulosa may refer to:

- Paralomis granulosa, the Chilean snow crab, a species of king crab
- Parepilysta granulosa, a species of beetle in the family Cerambycidae
- Peltigera granulosa, a species of lichen in the family Peltigeraceae
- Peristernia granulosa, a species of sea snail in the family Fasciolariidae
- Peziza granulosa, a species of apothecial fungus in the family Pezizaceae
- Pradosia granulosa, a species of plant in the family Sapotaceae
- Pterolophia granulosa, a species of beetle in the family Cerambycidae

== Synonyms ==
- Parmelia granulosa, a synonym of Montanelia disjuncta, the mealy camouflage lichen
- Peschiera granulosa, a synonym of Tabernaemontana hystrix
