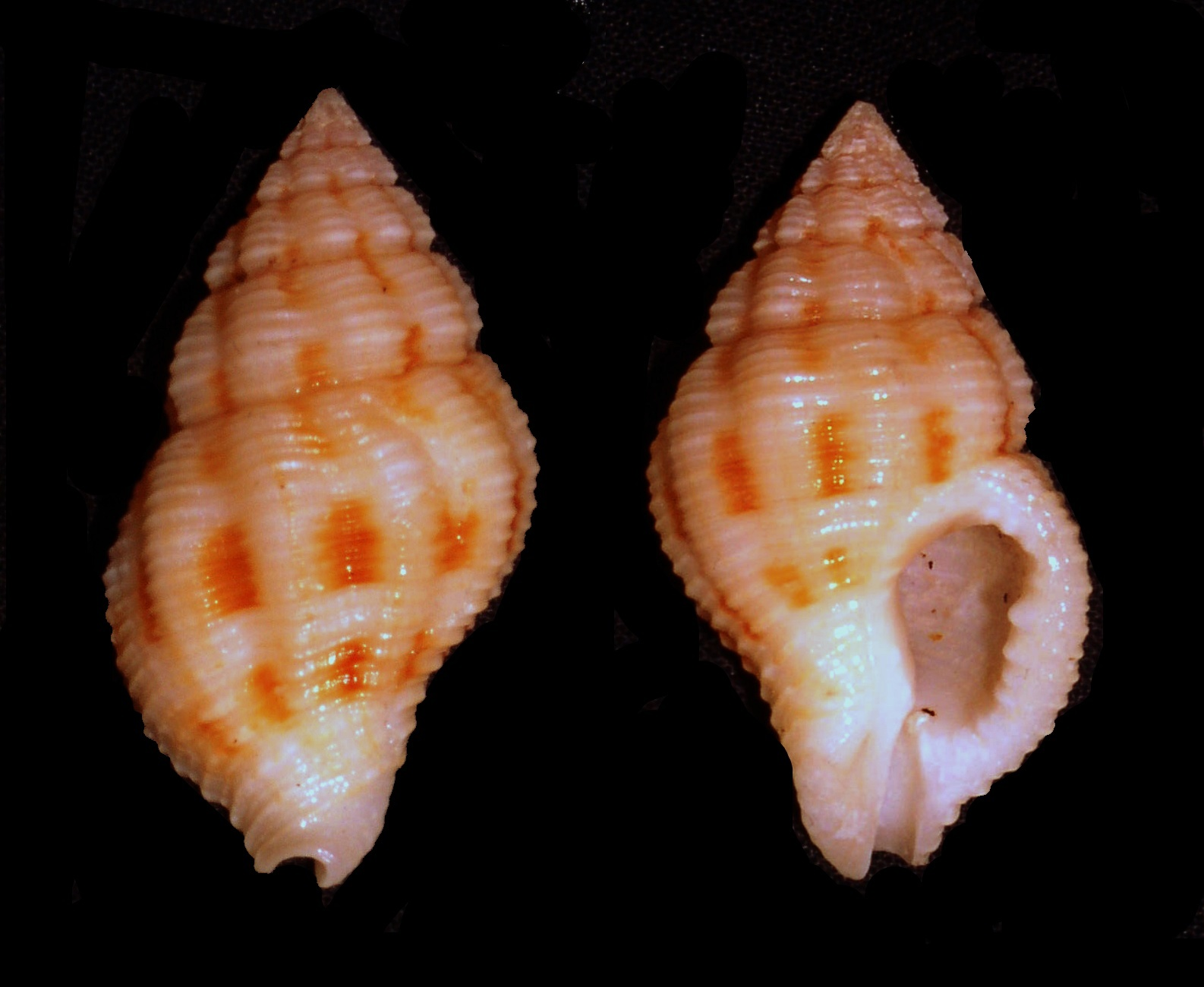
- Peristernia nassatula shell

Scientific classification
- Kingdom: Animalia
- Phylum: Mollusca
- Class: Gastropoda
- Subclass: Caenogastropoda
- Order: Neogastropoda
- Superfamily: Buccinoidea
- Family: Fasciolariidae
- Genus: Peristernia; Mörch, 1852

Type species
- Turbinella nassatula Lamarck, 1822

Synonyms
- Ascolatirus Bellardi, 1884; Latirus (Peristernia) Möch, 1852; Plicatella (Peristernia) Mörch, 1852; Turbinella (Peristernia) Mörch, 1852 (original rank)

= Peristernia =

Genus of gastropods

Peristernia is a genus of sea snails, marine gastropod mollusks in the subfamily Peristerniinae of the family Fasciolariidae, the spindle snails, the tulip snails and their allies.

== Description ==
The shell is subturreted, not umbilicated. The whorls are longitudinally ribbed. The aperture is oval. The siphonal canal is moderate and recurved. The outer lip is thin and crenulated. The columella shows one or two slight plaits anteriorly.

== Species ==
Species within the genus Peristernia include:

- Peristernia aethiops Macpherson, 1959
- † Peristernia allioni (Michelotti, 1847)
- Peristernia angulata (G.B. Sowerby III, 1888)
- Peristernia australiensis (Reeve, 1847)
- Peristernia bicolor (Küster & Kobelt, 1874)
- Peristernia boutetorum Tröndlé, 2017
- Peristernia canthariformis Melvill, 1891
- Peristernia carlajoostae Lussi, 2014
- Peristernia carotiana (Tapparone-Canefri, 1880)
- Peristernia castanoleuca Tapparone-Canefri, 1879
- Peristernia chlorostoma (G.B. Sowerby I, 1825)
- Peristernia clathrata (Valenciennes, 1840)
- Peristernia columbarium (Gmelin, 1791)
- Peristernia cremnochione Melvill, 1891
- Peristernia crocea (Gray, 1839)
- Peristernia decorata (Adams, 1855)
- Peristernia despecta (Adams, 1855)
- Peristernia forskalii (Tapparone-Canefri, 1875)
- Peristernia funiculata (Tapparone-Canefri, 1882)
- Peristernia fuscotincta (G.B. Sowerby III, 1886)
- Peristernia gemmata (Reeve, 1847)
- Peristernia granulosa (Pease, 1868)
- Peristernia hilaris Melvill, 1891
- Peristernia igorshlegeli Bozzetti, 2020
- Peristernia incerta Schepman, 1911
- Peristernia iniuensis Melvill, 1891
- Peristernia jeaniae (Melvill, 1911)
- Peristernia lirata (Pease, 1868)
- Peristernia loebbeckei (Küster & Kobelt, 1876)
- Peristernia malvastoma Lussi, 2014
- Peristernia marquesana (A. Adams, 1855)
- Peristernia melanorhynca (Tapparone-Canefri, 1882)
- Peristernia moltenii Bozzetti, 2014
- Peristernia nassatula (Lamarck, 1822)
- Peristernia neglecta (A. Adams, 1855)
- Peristernia nigritella (Tapparone-Canefri, 1882)
- Peristernia pulchella (Reeve, 1847)
- Peristernia reincarnata Snyder, 2000
- Peristernia retiaria Melvill, 1891
- Peristernia rollandi (Bernardi & Crosse, 1861)
- Peristernia rosea (Reeve, 1846)
- Peristernia scabra (Souverbie, 1869) (taxon inquirendum)
- Peristernia schepmani Dekkers, 2014
- Peristernia smithiana Melvill, 1891
- Peristernia squamosa (Pease, 1863)
- Peristernia striata (Gray, 1839)
- Peristernia sulcata (Gray, 1839)
- Peristernia taitensis (Lesson, 1842)
- Peristernia tayloriana (Reeve, 1848)
- Peristernia tulipa (Lesson, 1841)
- Peristernia ustulata (Reeve, 1847)
- Peristernia venusta Smith, 1911
- Peristernia violacea (Reeve, 1847)

Species brought into synonymy

- Peristernia aureocincta Sowerby, 1875: synonym of Latirus aureocinctus G. B. Sowerby III, 1875: synonym of Teralatirus noumeensis (Crosse, 1870): synonym of Crassicantharus noumeensis (Crosse, 1870)
- Peristernia bonasia (Martens, 1880): synonym of Engina bonasia (E. von Martens, 1880)
- Peristernia brazieri Angas, 1877: synonym of Nodopelagia brazieri (Angas, 1877)
- Peristernia corallina Melvill & Standen, 1903 : synonym of Orania corallina (Melvill & Standen, 1903)
- Peristernia deshayesii Küster & Kobelt, 1876 : synonym of Peristernia nassatula var. deshayesii Küster & Kobelt, 1876
- Peristernia fenestrata Gould, 1860 : synonym of Vaughtia fenestrata (Gould, 1860)
- Peristernia fragaria Wood: synonym of Engina fragaria (W. Wood, 1828)
- Peristernia incarnata: synonym of Peristernia reincarnata Snyder, 2000
- Peristernia leucothea Melvill, 1891: synonym of Peristernia forskalii leucothea Melvill, 1891
- Peristernia mannophora Melvill, 1891 : synonym of Latirus mannophorus (Melvill, 1891)
- Peristernia neglecta (Adams, 1855) : synonym of Peristernia pulchella (Reeve, 1847)
- Peristernia nodulosa A. Adams, 1855 : synonym of Attiliosa nodulosa (A. Adams, 1855)
- Peristernia paulucciae Tapparone-Canefri, 1879 : synonym of Engina paulucciae (Tapparone-Canefri, 1879)
- Peristernia philberti (Récluz, 1844): synonym of Latirus philberti (Récluz, 1844)
- Peristernia pilsbryi Kuroda & Habe, 1952 : synonym of Fusolatirus coreanicus (E.A. Smith, 1879)
- Peristernia rubens (Lamarck, 1822): synonym of Benimakia rubens (Lamarck, 1822)
- Peristernia rudolphi Brazier, 1894 : synonym of Litozamia rudolphi (Brazier, 1894)
- Peristernia scabrosa (Reeve, 1847) : synonym of Peristernia chlorostoma (Sowerby, 1825)
- Peristernia sowerbyi (Melvill, 1907): synonym of Benimakia sowerbyi (Melvill, 1907)
- Peristernia strangei (Adams, 1855) : synonym of Latirus strangei (Adams, 1855)
- Peristernia xantochrous (Tapparone-Canefri, 1880): synonym of Latirus xantochrous (Tapparone-Canefri, 1881)
- Peristernia zealandica (Küster & Kobelt, 1876): synonym of Benimakia rubens (Lamarck, 1822)
