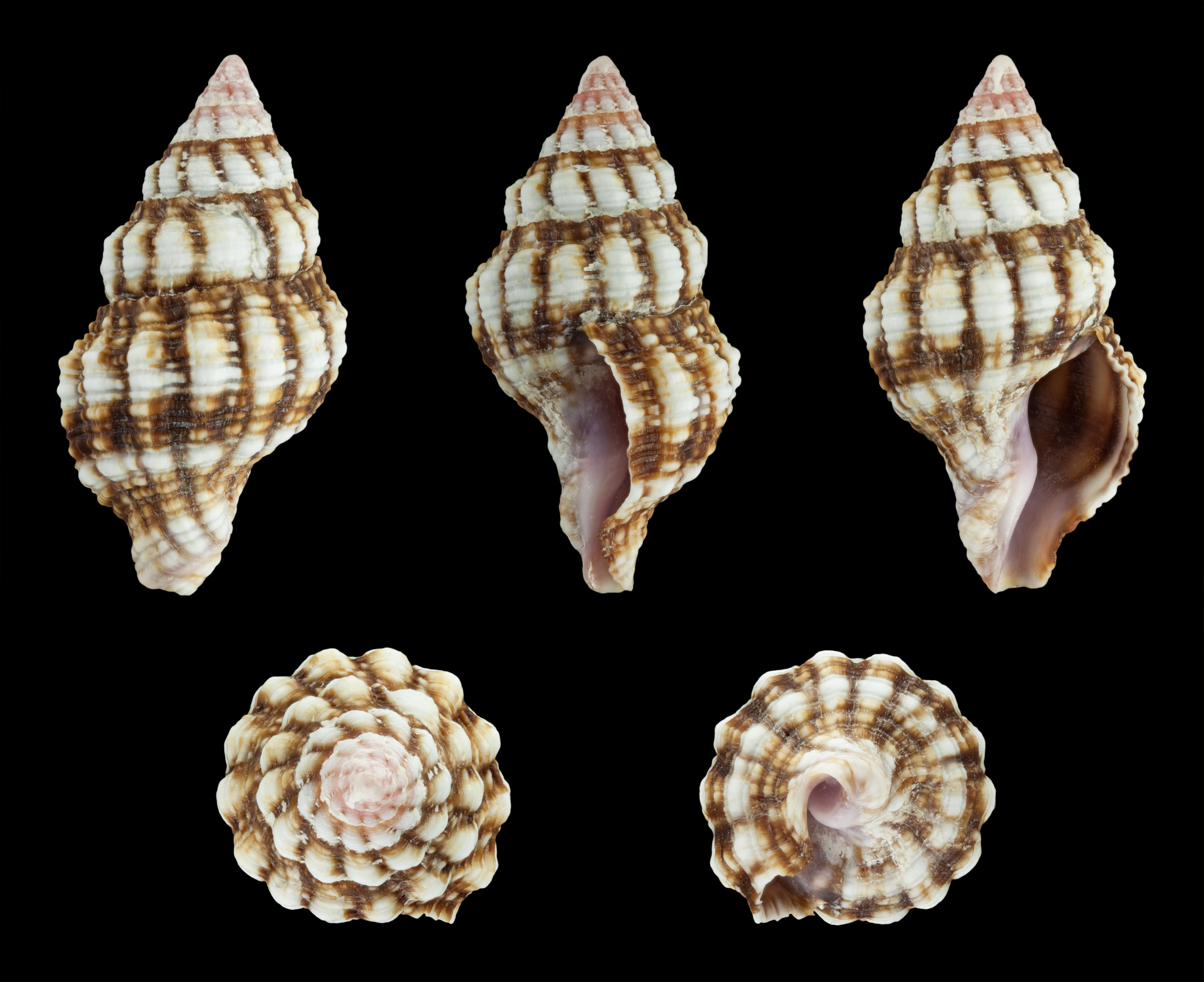

Scientific classification
- Kingdom: Animalia
- Phylum: Mollusca
- Class: Gastropoda
- Subclass: Caenogastropoda
- Order: Neogastropoda
- Family: Fasciolariidae
- Genus: Peristernia
- Species: P. forskalii

Binomial name
- Peristernia forskalii (Tapparone-Canefri, 1875)

Synonyms
- Latirus forskalii Tapparone-Canefri, 1875

= Peristernia forskalii =

Species of gastropod

Peristernia forskalii, common name the Forsskal's whelk, is a species of sea snail, a marine gastropod mollusk in the family Fasciolariidae, the spindle snails, the tulip snails and their allies.
