= Peristernia melanorhynca =

Scientific classification
- Kingdom: Animalia
- Phylum: Mollusca
- Class: Gastropoda
- Subclass: Caenogastropoda
- Order: Neogastropoda
- Family: Fasciolariidae
- Genus: Peristernia
- Species: P. melanorhynca

Binomial name
- Peristernia melanorhynca (Tapparone-Canefri, 1882)

Synonyms
- Latirus melanorhyncus Tapparone-Canefri, 1882

Species of gastropod

Peristernia melanorhynca is a species of sea snail, a marine gastropod mollusk in the family Fasciolariidae, the spindle snails, the tulip snails and their allies.
