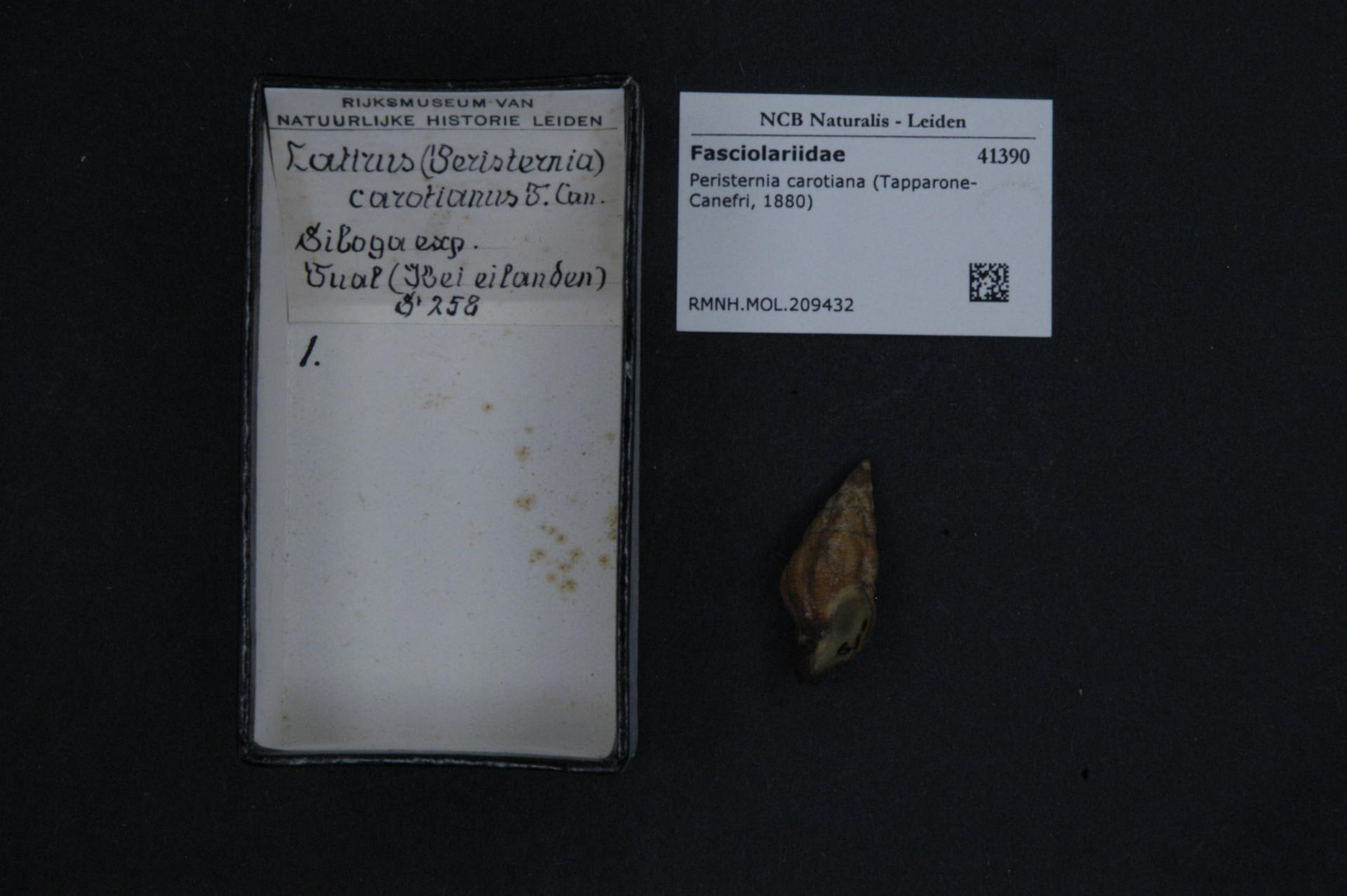

Scientific classification
- Kingdom: Animalia
- Phylum: Mollusca
- Class: Gastropoda
- Subclass: Caenogastropoda
- Order: Neogastropoda
- Family: Fasciolariidae
- Genus: Peristernia
- Species: P. carotiana

Binomial name
- Peristernia carotiana (Tapparone-Canefri, 1880)

Synonyms
- Latirus carotianus Tapparone-Canefri, 1880 (basionym)

= Peristernia carotiana =

Species of gastropod

Peristernia carotiana is a species of sea snail, a marine gastropod mollusk in the family Fasciolariidae, the spindle snails, the tulip snails and their allies.

== Distribution ==
This species is found in the Indian Ocean off Mauritius
