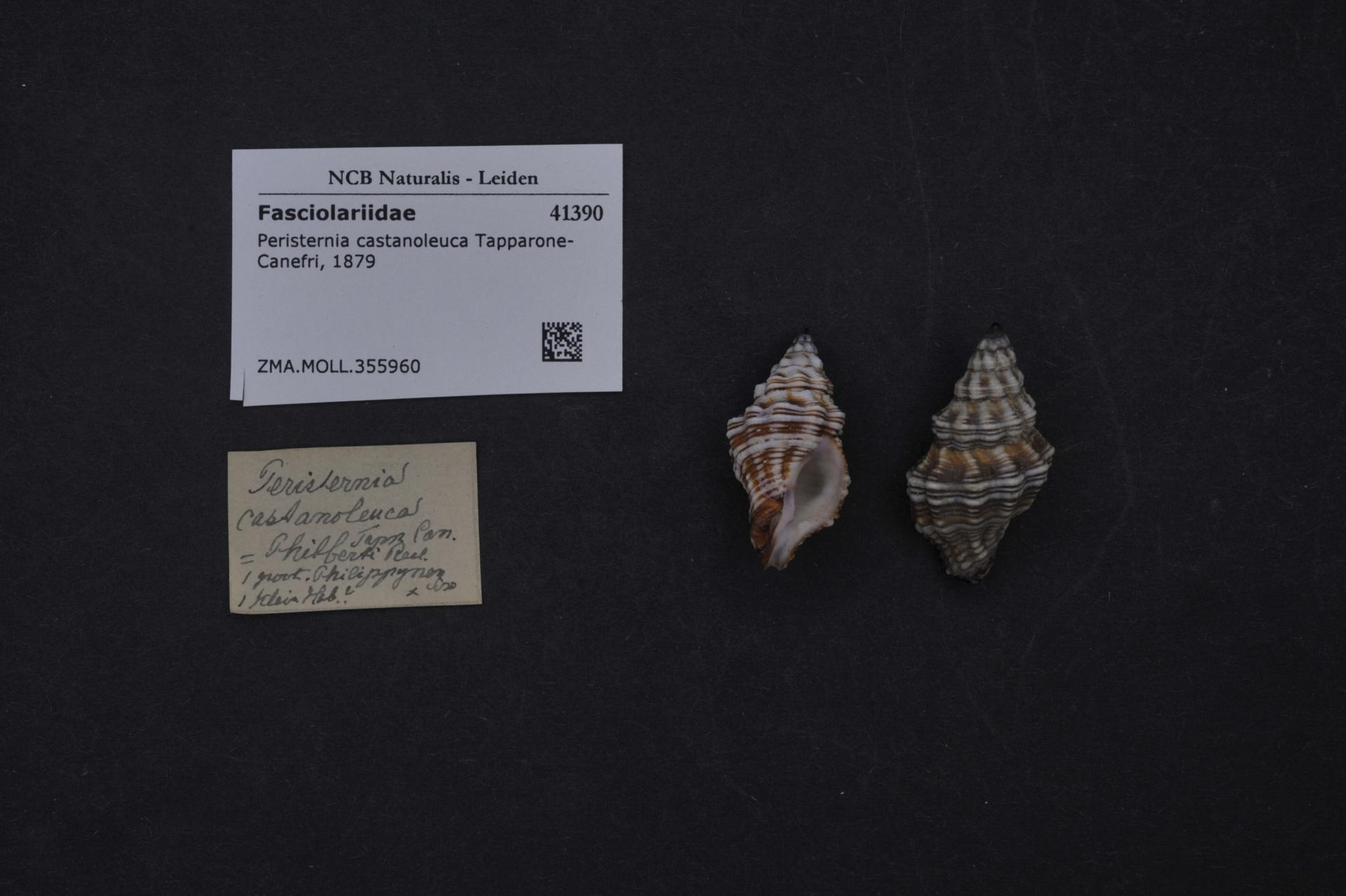

Scientific classification
- Kingdom: Animalia
- Phylum: Mollusca
- Class: Gastropoda
- Subclass: Caenogastropoda
- Order: Neogastropoda
- Family: Fasciolariidae
- Genus: Peristernia
- Species: P. castanoleuca

Binomial name
- Peristernia castanoleuca Tapparone-Canefri, 1879

= Peristernia castanoleuca =

Species of gastropod

Peristernia castanoleuca is a species of sea snail, a marine gastropod mollusk in the family Fasciolariidae, the spindle snails, the tulip snails and their allies.

== Description ==
This species attains a size of 25 mm. Sinistral examples are known.

== Distribution ==
Pacific Ocean: Philippines.
