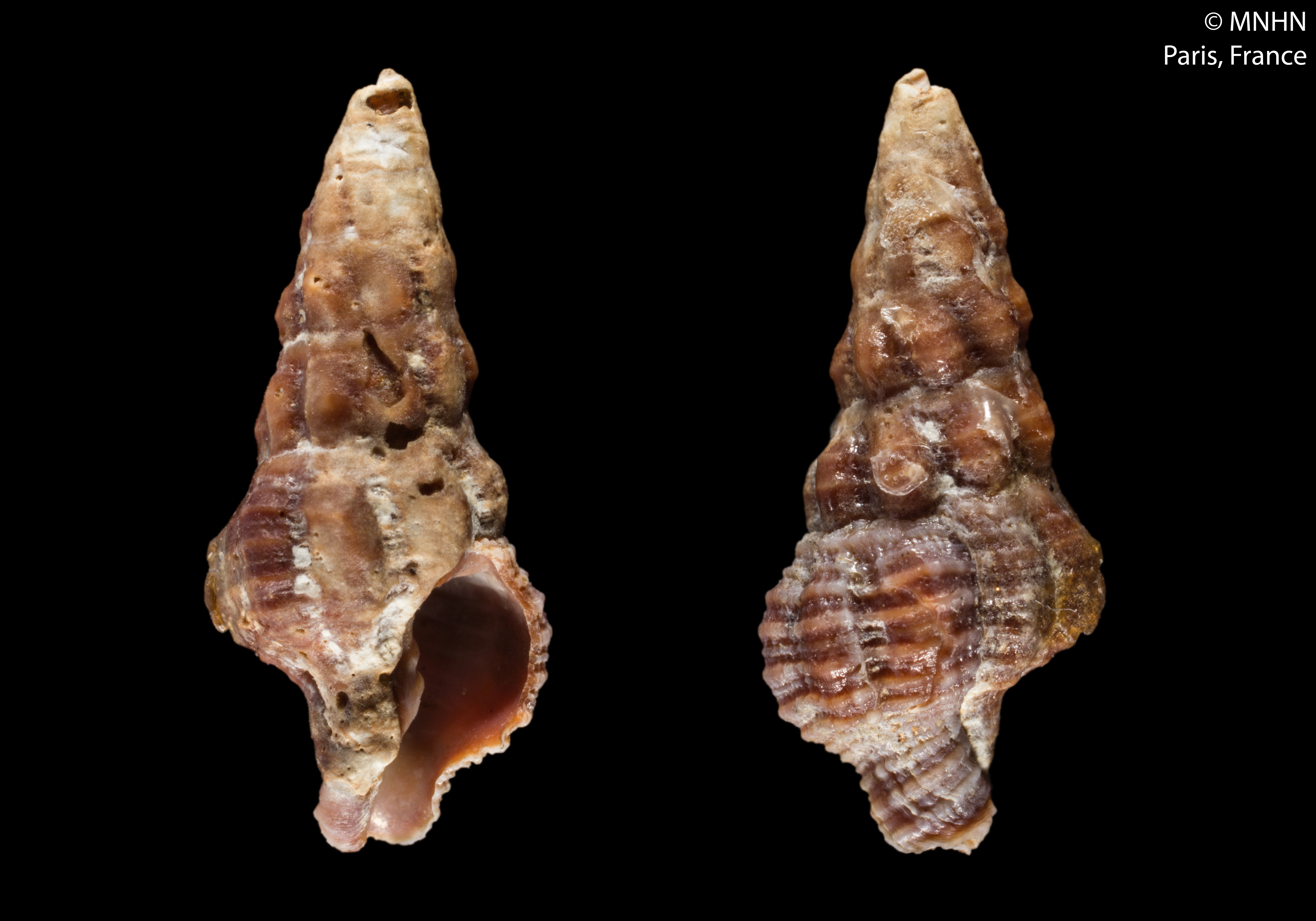
- Shell of Peristernia scabra (specimen at MNHN, Paris)

Scientific classification
- Kingdom: Animalia
- Phylum: Mollusca
- Class: Gastropoda
- Subclass: Caenogastropoda
- Order: Neogastropoda
- Family: Fasciolariidae
- Genus: Peristernia
- Species: P. scabra

Binomial name
- Peristernia scabra (Souverbie, 1869)

Synonyms
- Turbinella scabra Souverbie, 1869

= Peristernia scabra =

Species of gastropod

Peristernia scabra is a species of sea snail, a marine gastropod mollusk in the family Fasciolariidae, the spindle snails, the tulip snails and their allies.

This is a taxon inquirendum.

== Description ==
The length of the shell attains 14.2 mm

== Distribution ==
This marine species occurs off New Caledonia.
