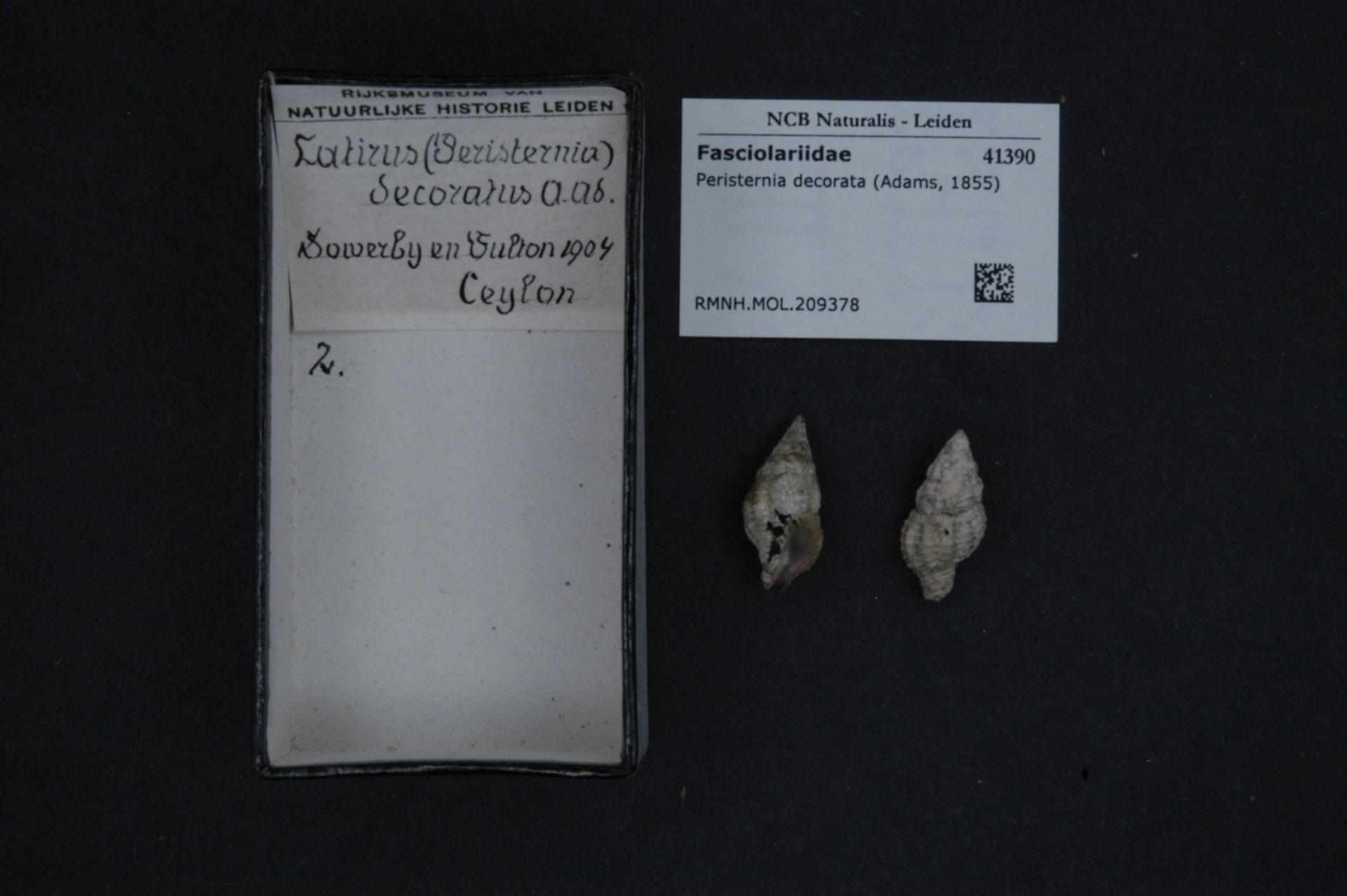

Scientific classification
- Kingdom: Animalia
- Phylum: Mollusca
- Class: Gastropoda
- Subclass: Caenogastropoda
- Order: Neogastropoda
- Family: Fasciolariidae
- Genus: Peristernia
- Species: P. decorata

Binomial name
- Peristernia decorata (Adams, 1855)

Synonyms
- Latirus decoratus Adams, 1855

= Peristernia decorata =

Species of gastropod

Peristernia decorata is a species of sea snail, a marine gastropod mollusk in the family Fasciolariidae, the spindle snails, the tulip snails and their allies.
