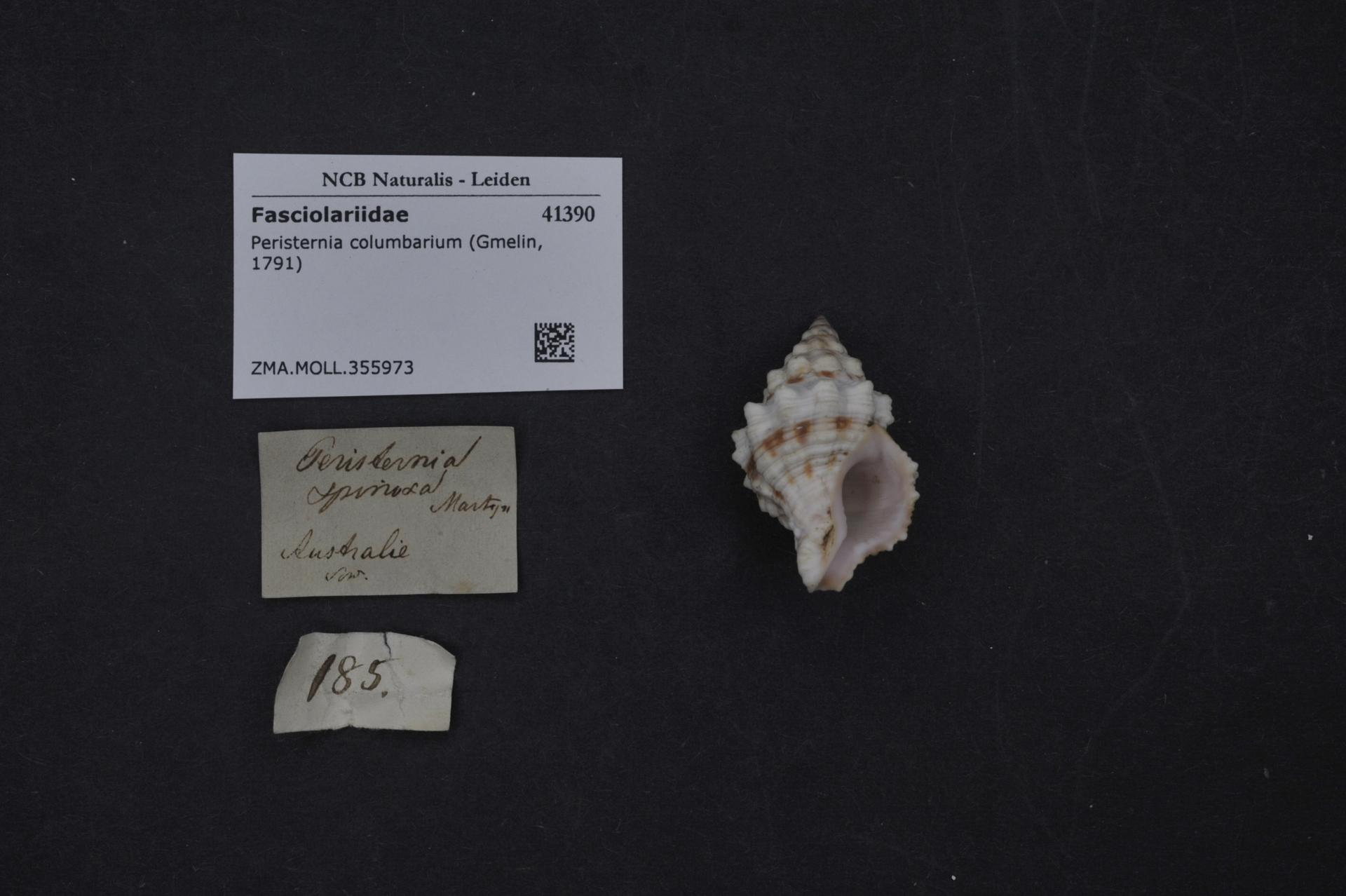

Scientific classification
- Kingdom: Animalia
- Phylum: Mollusca
- Class: Gastropoda
- Subclass: Caenogastropoda
- Order: Neogastropoda
- Family: Fasciolariidae
- Genus: Peristernia
- Species: P. columbarium

Binomial name
- Peristernia columbarium (Gmelin, 1791)

Synonyms
- Murex columbarium Gmelin, 1791

= Peristernia columbarium =

Species of gastropod

Peristernia columbarium is a species of sea snail, a marine gastropod mollusc in the family Fasciolariidae, the spindle snails, the tulip snails and their allies.
