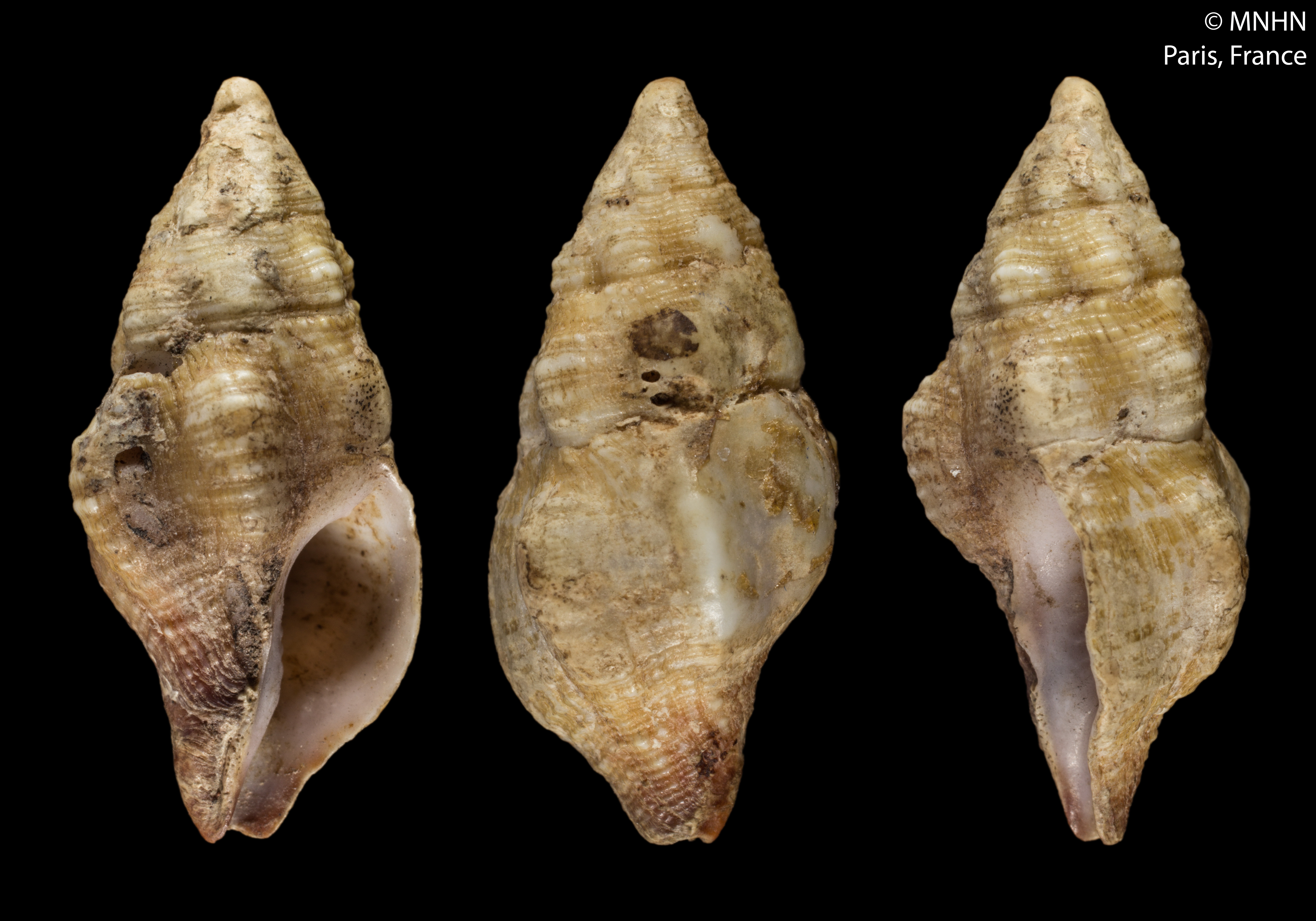
- Shell of Peristernia ustulata (holotype at MNHN, Paris)

Scientific classification
- Kingdom: Animalia
- Phylum: Mollusca
- Class: Gastropoda
- Subclass: Caenogastropoda
- Order: Neogastropoda
- Family: Fasciolariidae
- Genus: Peristernia
- Species: P. ustulata

Binomial name
- Peristernia ustulata (Reeve, 1847)

Synonyms
- Peristernia ustulata var. luchuana Pilsbry, 1901; Turbinella caledonica Petit de la Saussaye, 1851; Turbinella infracincta Kobelt, 1876 (junior synonym); Turbinella iricolor Hombron & Jacquinot, 1848; Turbinella ustulata Reeve, 1847

= Peristernia ustulata =

Species of gastropod

Peristernia ustulata (singed peristernia) is a species of sea snail, a marine gastropod mollusk in the family Fasciolariidae, the spindle snails, the tulip snails and their allies.

== Description ==
The length of the shell attains 24.8 mm. The species is a non-broadcast spawner without a trocophore stage.

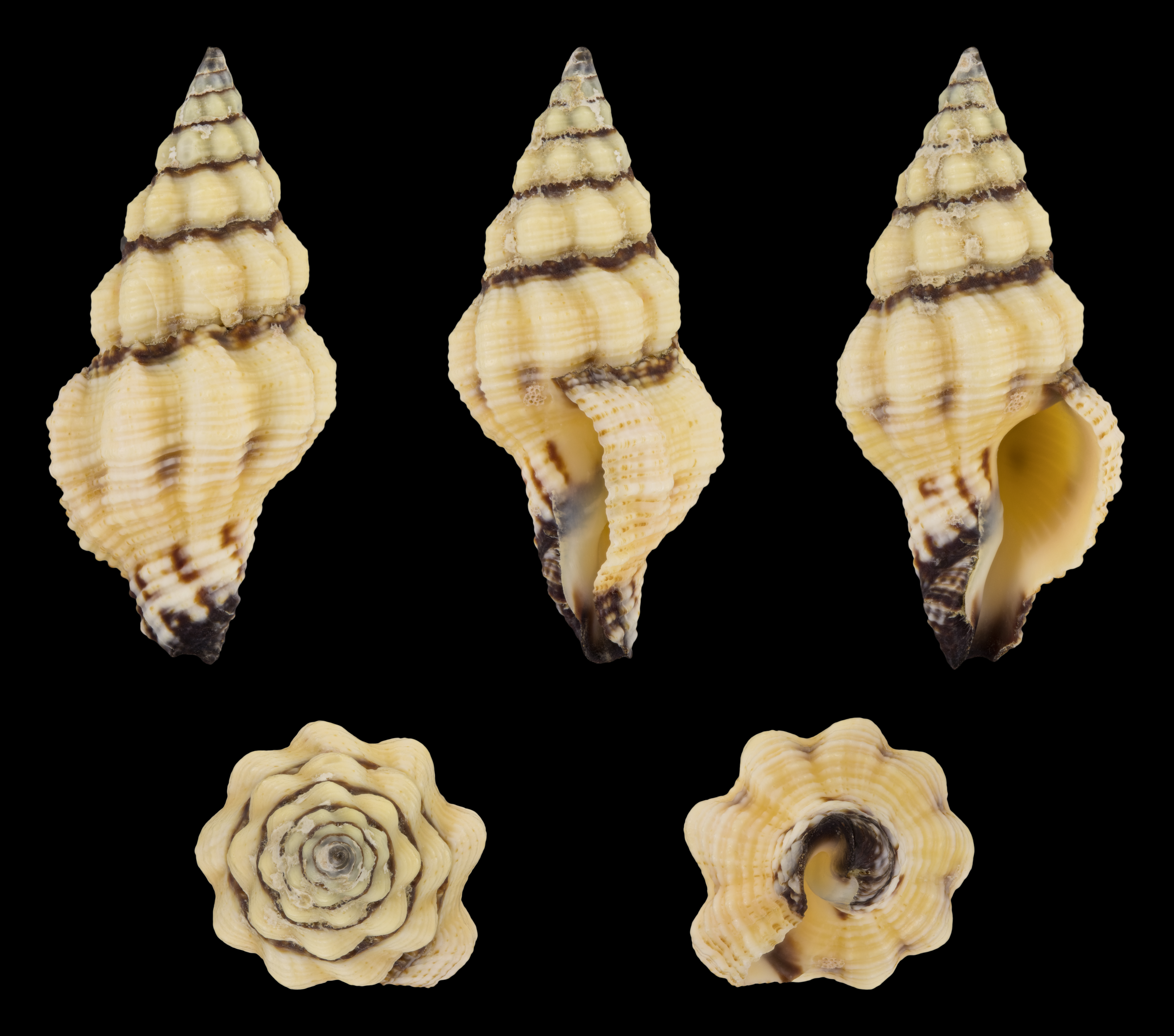
var. luchuana

== Distribution ==
Peristernia ustulata lives in waters in the Western Pacific including Indonesian, Australian, and Chinese seas.; also off Australia (Torres Strait) at depth of 10-41m.
