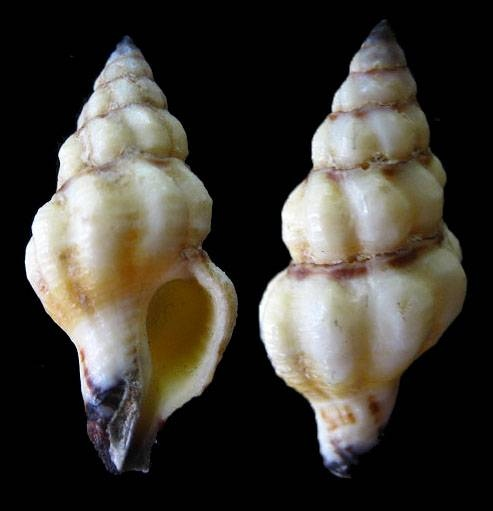

Scientific classification
- Kingdom: Animalia
- Phylum: Mollusca
- Class: Gastropoda
- Subclass: Caenogastropoda
- Order: Neogastropoda
- Family: Fasciolariidae
- Genus: Peristernia
- Species: P. marquesana

Binomial name
- Peristernia marquesana (Adams, 1855)

Synonyms
- Benimakia marquesana (A. Adams, 1855); Latirus marquesanus Adams, 1855

= Peristernia marquesana =

Species of gastropod

Peristernia marquesana is a species of sea snail, a marine gastropod mollusc in the family Fasciolariidae, the spindle snails, the tulip snails and their allies.

== Distribution ==
This marine species occurs off the Philippines and Papua New Guinea
