= Peristernia bicolor =

Scientific classification
- Kingdom: Animalia
- Phylum: Mollusca
- Class: Gastropoda
- Subclass: Caenogastropoda
- Order: Neogastropoda
- Family: Fasciolariidae
- Genus: Peristernia
- Species: P. bicolor

Binomial name
- Peristernia bicolor (Küster & Kobelt, 1874)

Synonyms
- Turbinella bicolor Küster & Kobelt, 1874

Species of gastropod

Peristernia bicolor is a species of sea snail, a marine gastropod mollusk in the family Fasciolariidae, the spindle snails, the tulip snails and their allies.
