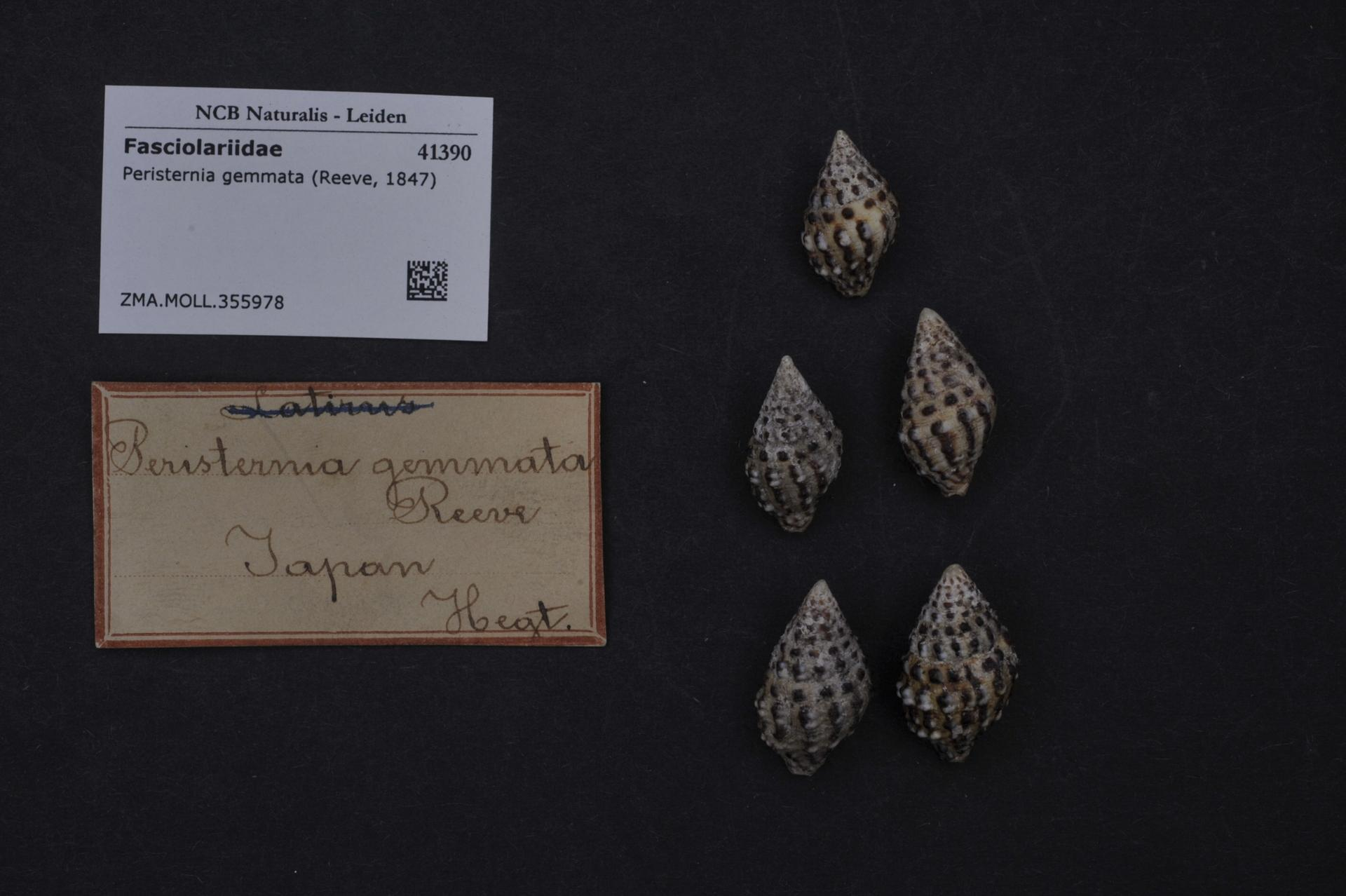

Scientific classification
- Kingdom: Animalia
- Phylum: Mollusca
- Class: Gastropoda
- Subclass: Caenogastropoda
- Order: Neogastropoda
- Family: Fasciolariidae
- Genus: Peristernia
- Species: P. gemmata

Binomial name
- Peristernia gemmata (Reeve, 1847)

Synonyms
- Turbinella gemmata Reeve, 1847

= Peristernia gemmata =

Species of gastropod

Peristernia gemmata is a species of sea snail, a marine gastropod mollusk in the family Fasciolariidae, the spindle snails, the tulip snails and their allies.
