= Latirus xantochrous =

Scientific classification
- Kingdom: Animalia
- Phylum: Mollusca
- Class: Gastropoda
- Subclass: Caenogastropoda
- Order: Neogastropoda
- Family: Fasciolariidae
- Genus: Latirus
- Species: L. xantochrous

Binomial name
- Latirus xantochrous (Tapparone-Canefri, 1880)

Synonyms
- Fusus xantochrous Tapparone-Canefri, 1880; Peristernia xantochroa (Tapparone-Canefri, 1881)

Species of gastropod

Latirus xantochrous is a species of sea snail, a marine gastropod mollusk in the family Fasciolariidae, the spindle snails, the tulip snails and their allies.

== Distribution ==
This species occurs in the Indian Ocean off Mauritius.
