= Peristernia jeaniae =

Scientific classification
- Kingdom: Animalia
- Phylum: Mollusca
- Class: Gastropoda
- Subclass: Caenogastropoda
- Order: Neogastropoda
- Family: Fasciolariidae
- Genus: Peristernia
- Species: P. jeaniae

Binomial name
- Peristernia jeaniae (Melvill, 1911)

Synonyms
- Latirus jeaniae Melvill, 1911

Species of gastropod

Peristernia jeaniae is a species of sea snail, a marine gastropod mollusk in the family Fasciolariidae, the spindle snails, the tulip snails and their allies.
