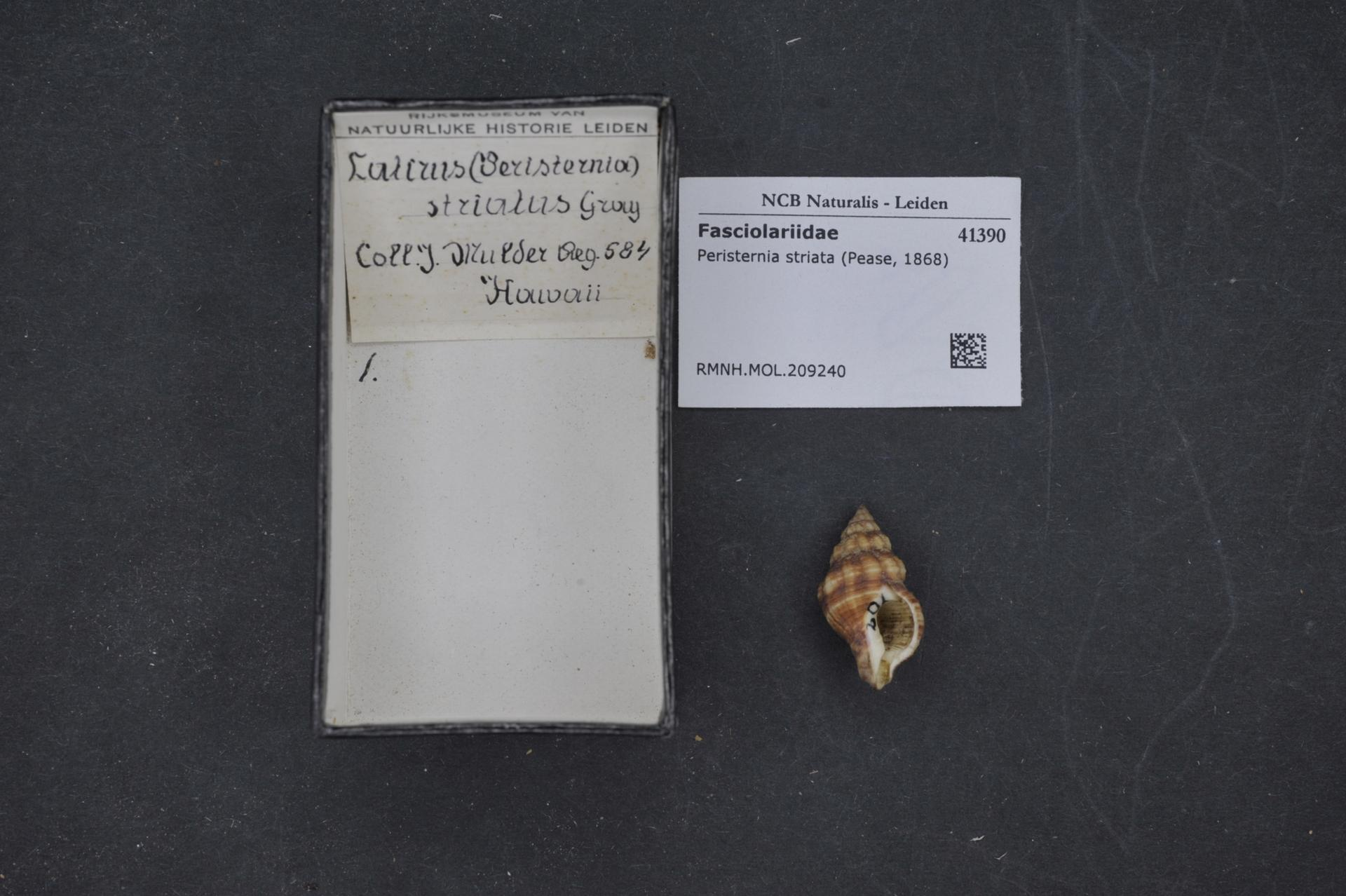

Scientific classification
- Kingdom: Animalia
- Phylum: Mollusca
- Class: Gastropoda
- Subclass: Caenogastropoda
- Order: Neogastropoda
- Family: Fasciolariidae
- Genus: Peristernia
- Species: P. striata

Binomial name
- Peristernia striata (Pease, 1868)

Synonyms
- Turbinella striata Gray, 1839

= Peristernia striata =

Species of gastropod

Peristernia striata is a species of sea snail, a marine gastropod mollusc in the family Fasciolariidae, which consists primarily of spindle and tulip snails.
