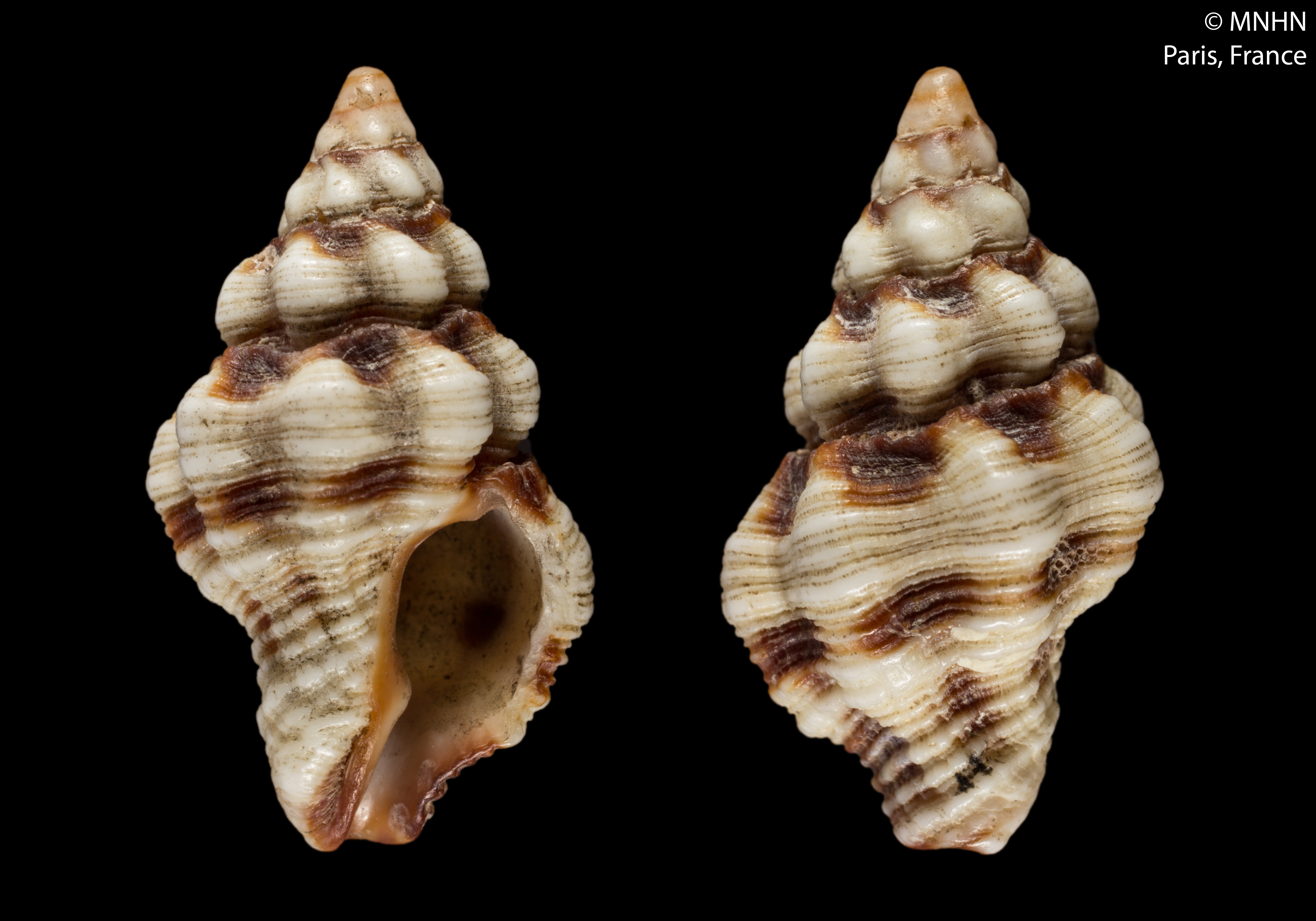
- Shell of Peristernia chlorostoma (syntype at MNHN, Paris)

Scientific classification
- Kingdom: Animalia
- Phylum: Mollusca
- Class: Gastropoda
- Subclass: Caenogastropoda
- Order: Neogastropoda
- Family: Fasciolariidae
- Genus: Peristernia
- Species: P. chlorostoma

Binomial name
- Peristernia chlorostoma (G.B. Sowerby I, 1825)

Synonyms
- Latirus newcombii A. Adams, 1855 junior subjective synonym; Latirus scabrosus (Reeve, 1847) · unaccepted; Peristernia scabrosa (Reeve, 1847); Turbinella chlorostoma G.B. Sowerby I, 1825; Turbinella crenulata Kiener, 1840; Turbinella scabrosa Reeve, 1847

= Peristernia chlorostoma =

Species of gastropod

Peristernia chlorostoma is a species of sea snail, a marine gastropod mollusc in the family Fasciolariidae, the spindle snails, the tulip snails and their allies.

== Description ==
The length of the shell attains 20.5 mm.

== Distribution ==
This marine species occurs Hawaii, the Philippines, Cook Islands, Midway, the Mariana Islands and New Caledonia.
