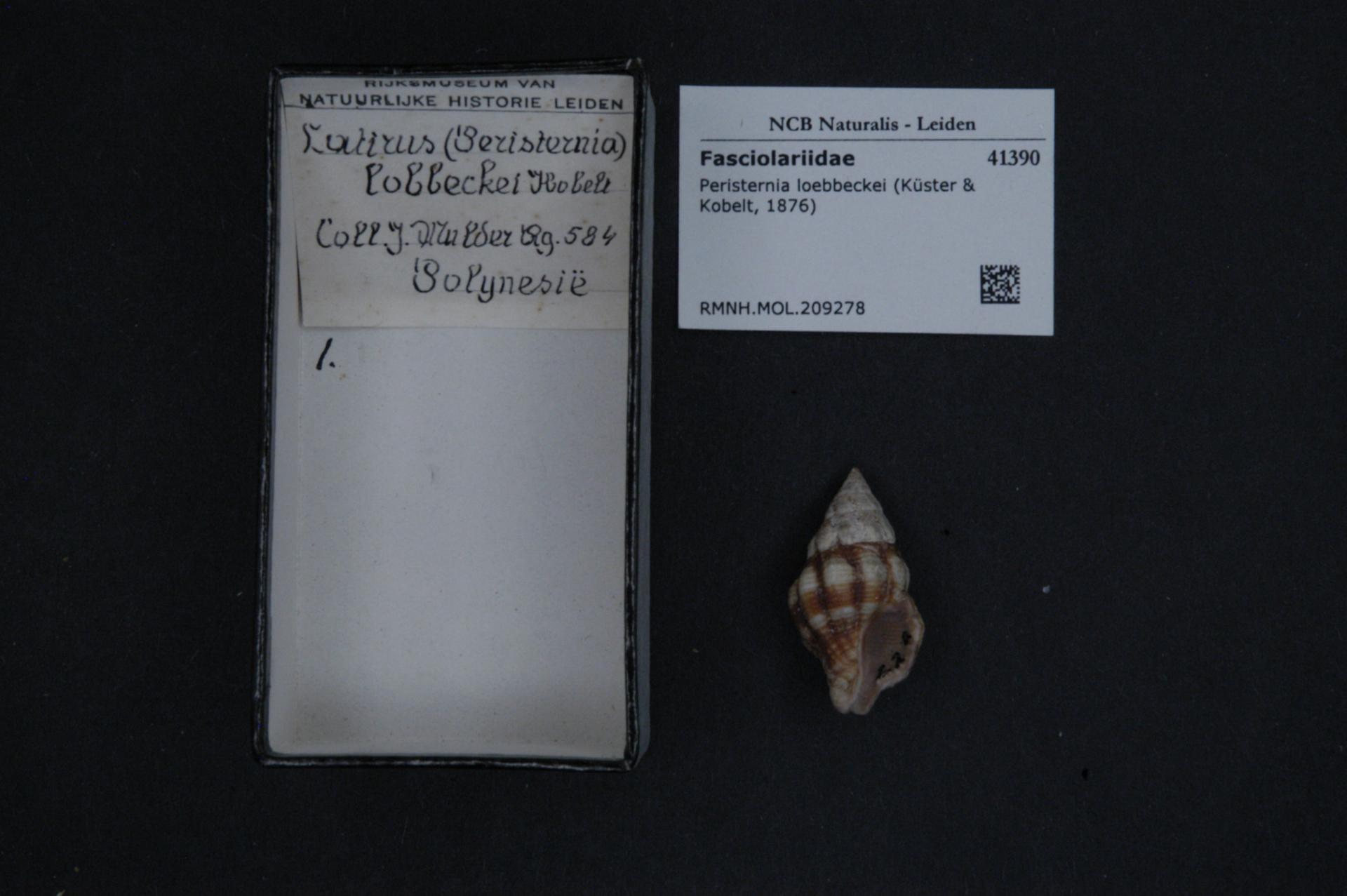

Scientific classification
- Kingdom: Animalia
- Phylum: Mollusca
- Class: Gastropoda
- Subclass: Caenogastropoda
- Order: Neogastropoda
- Family: Fasciolariidae
- Genus: Peristernia
- Species: P. loebbeckei

Binomial name
- Peristernia loebbeckei (Küster & Kobelt, 1876)

Synonyms
- Turbinella loebbeckei Küster & Kobelt, 1876

= Peristernia loebbeckei =

Species of gastropod

Peristernia loebbeckei is a species of sea snail, a marine gastropod mollusk in the family Fasciolariidae, the spindle snails, the tulip snails and their allies.
