= Parepilysta strandi =

Scientific classification
- Kingdom: Animalia
- Phylum: Arthropoda
- Class: Insecta
- Order: Coleoptera
- Suborder: Polyphaga
- Infraorder: Cucujiformia
- Family: Cerambycidae
- Genus: Parepilysta
- Species: P. strandi

Binomial name
- Parepilysta strandi Breuning, 1939

Species of beetle

Parepilysta strandi is a species of beetle in the family Cerambycidae. It was described by Breuning in 1939.

It is 9 mm long and 2.7 mm wide, and its type locality is Cenderawasih Bay on the island of New Guinea. It was named in honor of Embrik Strand, in whose Festschrift the species description was written.
