= Peristernia australiensis =

Scientific classification
- Kingdom: Animalia
- Phylum: Mollusca
- Class: Gastropoda
- Subclass: Caenogastropoda
- Order: Neogastropoda
- Family: Fasciolariidae
- Genus: Peristernia
- Species: P. australiensis

Binomial name
- Peristernia australiensis (Reeve, 1847)

Synonyms
- Latirus australiensis Reeve, 1847; Turbinella australiensis Reeve, 1847

Species of gastropod

Peristernia australiensis is a species of sea snail, a marine gastropod mollusk in the family Fasciolariidae, the spindle snails, the tulip snails and their allies.

== Ecology ==
Parasites of Peristernia australiensis include trematode Lobatostoma manteri.
