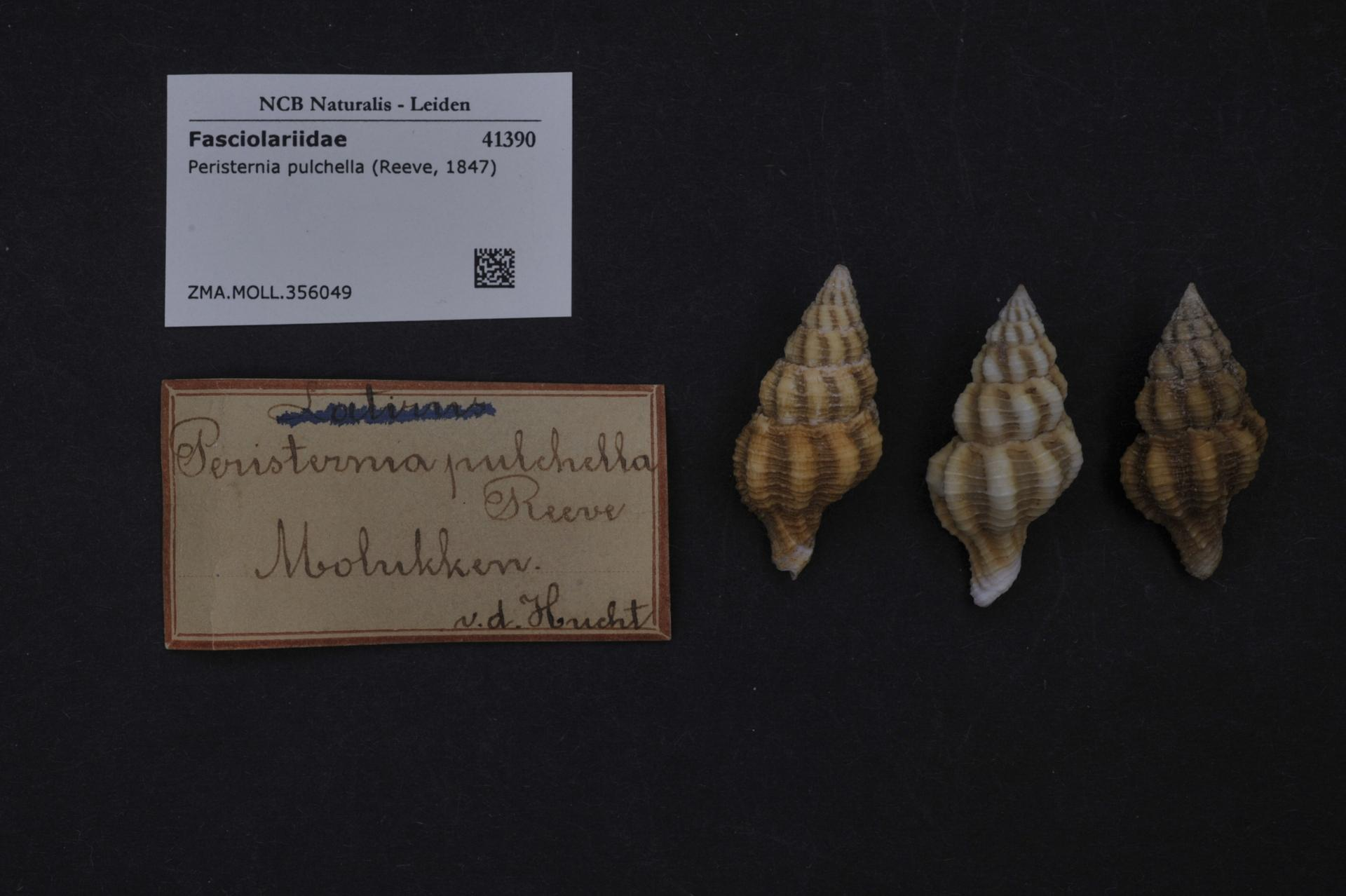

Scientific classification
- Kingdom: Animalia
- Phylum: Mollusca
- Class: Gastropoda
- Subclass: Caenogastropoda
- Order: Neogastropoda
- Family: Fasciolariidae
- Genus: Peristernia
- Species: P. pulchella

Binomial name
- Peristernia pulchella (Reeve, 1847)

Synonyms
- Turbinella pulchella Reeve, 1847

= Peristernia pulchella =

Species of gastropod

Peristernia pulchella is a species of sea snail, a marine gastropod mollusk in the family Fasciolariidae.
