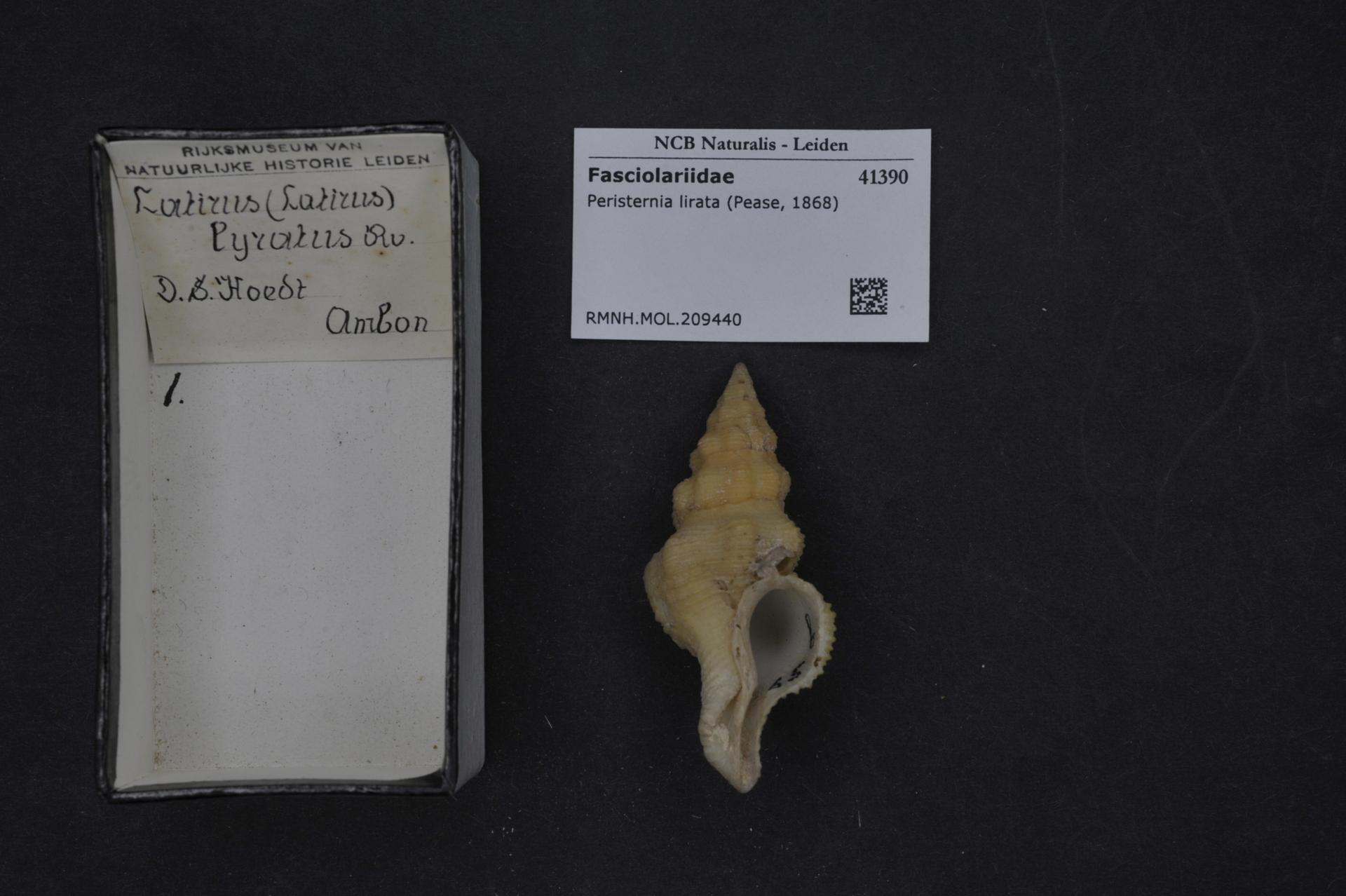

Scientific classification
- Kingdom: Animalia
- Phylum: Mollusca
- Class: Gastropoda
- Subclass: Caenogastropoda
- Order: Neogastropoda
- Family: Fasciolariidae
- Genus: Peristernia
- Species: P. lirata

Binomial name
- Peristernia lirata (Pease, 1868)

Synonyms
- Latirus liratus Pease, 1868

= Peristernia lirata =

Species of gastropod

Peristernia lirata is a species of sea snail, a marine gastropod mollusk in the family Fasciolariidae, the spindle snails, the tulip snails and their allies.
