= Parepilysta ochreoguttata =

Scientific classification
- Kingdom: Animalia
- Phylum: Arthropoda
- Class: Insecta
- Order: Coleoptera
- Suborder: Polyphaga
- Infraorder: Cucujiformia
- Family: Cerambycidae
- Genus: Parepilysta
- Species: P. ochreoguttata

Binomial name
- Parepilysta ochreoguttata Breuning, 1961

Species of beetle

Parepilysta ochreoguttata is a species of beetle in the family Cerambycidae. It was described by Breuning in 1961.
