= Peristernia hilaris =

Scientific classification
- Kingdom: Animalia
- Phylum: Mollusca
- Class: Gastropoda
- Subclass: Caenogastropoda
- Order: Neogastropoda
- Family: Fasciolariidae
- Genus: Peristernia
- Species: P. hilaris

Binomial name
- Peristernia hilaris Melvill, 1891

Species of gastropod

Peristernia hilaris is a species of sea snail, a marine gastropod mollusk in the family Fasciolariidae, the spindle snails, the tulip snails and their allies.
