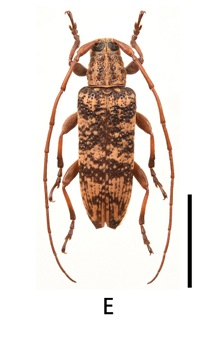

Scientific classification
- Kingdom: Animalia
- Phylum: Arthropoda
- Class: Insecta
- Order: Coleoptera
- Suborder: Polyphaga
- Infraorder: Cucujiformia
- Family: Cerambycidae
- Genus: Parepilysta
- Species: P. striatipennis

Binomial name
- Parepilysta striatipennis Breuning, 1949

Synonyms
- Parepilysta (Striatepilysta) striatipennis Breuning, 1949

= Parepilysta striatipennis =

Species of beetle

Parepilysta striatipennis is a species of beetle in the family Cerambycidae. It was described by Breuning in 1949. This species is found in Myanmar and China (Yunnan).
