= Parepilysta =

- Parepilysta puncticollis female

Scientific classification
- Kingdom: Animalia
- Phylum: Arthropoda
- Class: Insecta
- Order: Coleoptera
- Suborder: Polyphaga
- Infraorder: Cucujiformia
- Family: Cerambycidae
- Subfamily: Lamiinae
- Tribe: Apomecynini
- Genus: Parepilysta; Breuning, 1939

Type species
- Parepilysta strandi Breuning, 1939

Genus of beetles

Parepilysta is a genus of beetles in the family Cerambycidae, containing the following species:

subgenus Fasciatepilysta

- Parepilysta subfasciata (Schwarzer, 1931)

subgenus Granosepilysta

- Parepilysta basigranosa (Schwarzer, 1931)

subgenus Parepilysta

- Parepilysta granulipennis (Breuning, 1939)
- Parepilysta granulosa Breuning, 1939
- Parepilysta strandi Breuning, 1939
- Parepilysta woodlarkiana Breuning, 1976

subgenus Spinepilysta

- Parepilysta borneana Breuning, 1961
- Parepilysta enganensis Breuning, 1970
- Parepilysta luzonica Breuning, 1956
- Parepilysta mindoroensis Breuning, 1947
- Parepilysta ochreoguttata Breuning, 1961
- Parepilysta papuana Breuning, 1956
- Parepilysta sedlaceki Breuning, 1976

subgenus Striatepilysta

- Parepilysta striatipennis Breuning, 1949
