= Peristernia crocea =

Scientific classification
- Kingdom: Animalia
- Phylum: Mollusca
- Class: Gastropoda
- Subclass: Caenogastropoda
- Order: Neogastropoda
- Family: Fasciolariidae
- Genus: Peristernia
- Species: P. crocea

Binomial name
- Peristernia crocea (Gray, 1839)

Synonyms
- Turbinella crocea Gray, 1839

Species of gastropod

Peristernia crocea is a species of sea snail, a marine gastropod mollusk in the family Fasciolariidae, the spindle snails, the tulip snails and their allies.
