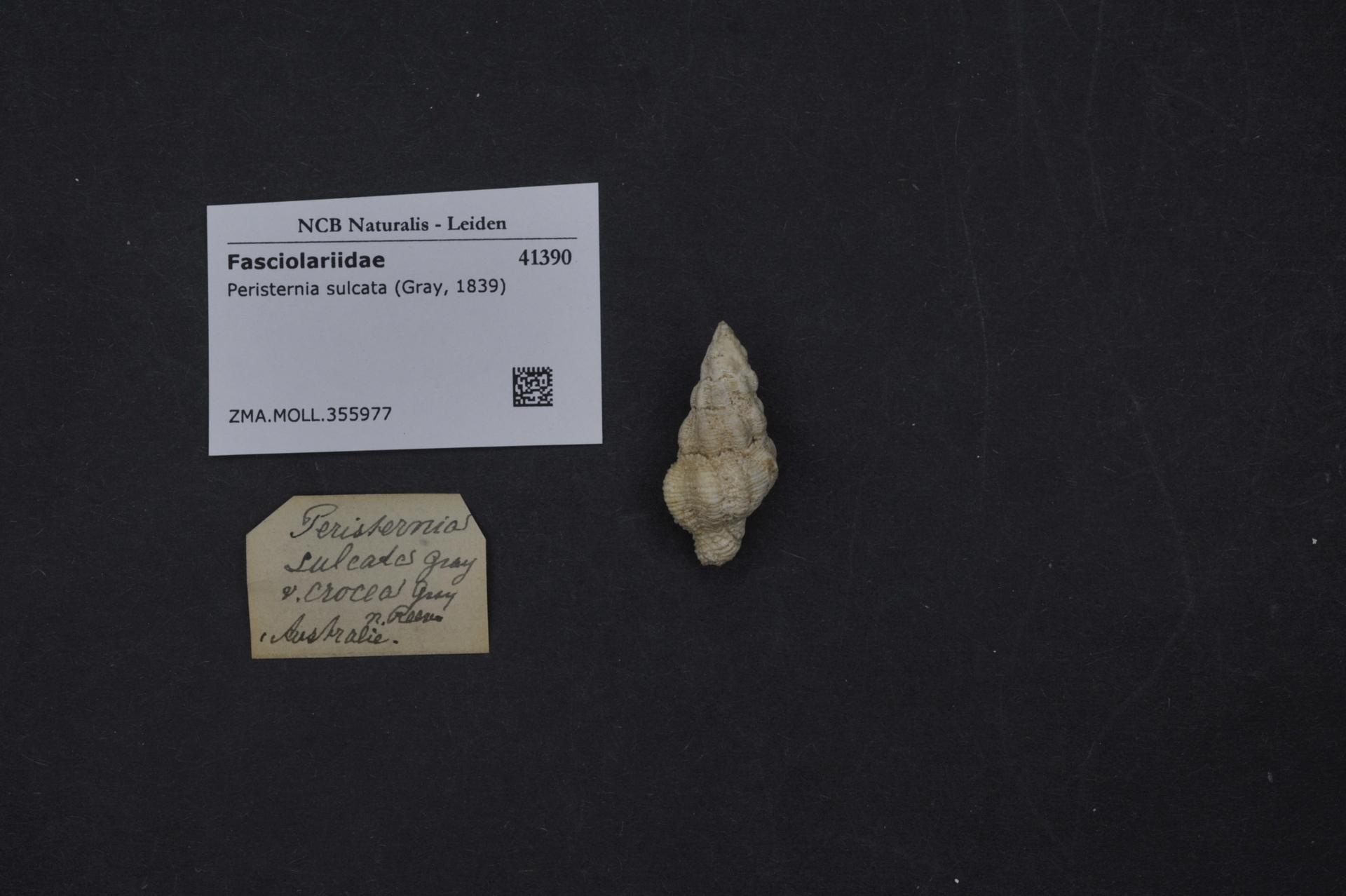

Scientific classification
- Kingdom: Animalia
- Phylum: Mollusca
- Class: Gastropoda
- Subclass: Caenogastropoda
- Order: Neogastropoda
- Family: Fasciolariidae
- Genus: Peristernia
- Species: P. sulcata

Binomial name
- Peristernia sulcata (Gray, 1839)

Synonyms
- Fusus sulcatus Gray, 1839

= Peristernia sulcata =

Species of gastropod

Peristernia sulcata is a species of sea snail, a marine gastropod mollusc in the family Fasciolariidae, the spindle snails, the tulip snails and their allies.
