= Peristernia angulata =

Scientific classification
- Kingdom: Animalia
- Phylum: Mollusca
- Class: Gastropoda
- Subclass: Caenogastropoda
- Order: Neogastropoda
- Family: Fasciolariidae
- Genus: Peristernia
- Species: P. angulata

Binomial name
- Peristernia angulata (G.B. Sowerby III, 1888)

Synonyms
- Engina angulata G.B. Sowerby III, 1888

Species of gastropod

Peristernia angulata is a species of sea snail, a marine gastropod mollusk in the family Fasciolariidae, the spindle snails, the tulip snails and their allies.
