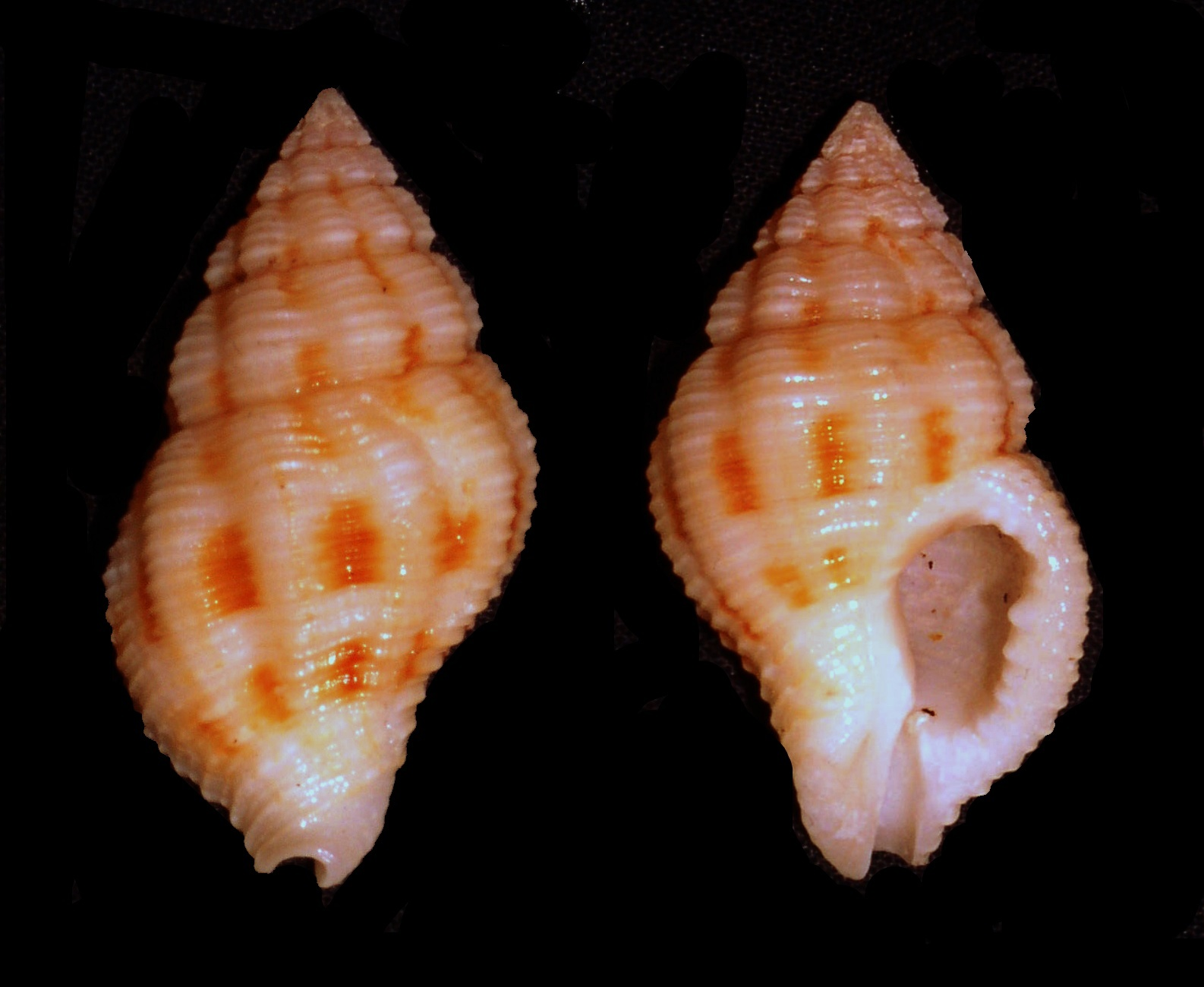
- Peristernia nassatula shell

Scientific classification
- Kingdom: Animalia
- Phylum: Mollusca
- Class: Gastropoda
- Subclass: Caenogastropoda
- Order: Neogastropoda
- Family: Fasciolariidae
- Genus: Peristernia
- Species: P. nassatula

Binomial name
- Peristernia nassatula (Lamarck, 1822)

Synonyms
- Latirus nassatula (Lamarck, 1822); Peristernia deshayesii (Kobelt, 1876); Peristernia nassatula var. deshayesii (Kobelt, 1876) (junior synonym); Turbinella deshayesi Kobelt, 1876 (junior synonym); Turbinella microstoma Kobelt, 1876 (junior synonym); Turbinella nassatula Lamarck, 1822

= Peristernia nassatula =

Species of gastropod

Peristernia nassatula is a species of sea snail, a marine gastropod mollusk in the family Fasciolariidae, the spindle snails, the tulip snails and their allies.

== Distribution ==
This marine species occurs off the Philippines and off Papua New Guinea
