= Peristernia taitensis =

Scientific classification
- Kingdom: Animalia
- Phylum: Mollusca
- Class: Gastropoda
- Subclass: Caenogastropoda
- Order: Neogastropoda
- Family: Fasciolariidae
- Genus: Peristernia
- Species: P. taitensis

Binomial name
- Peristernia taitensis (Lesson, 1842)

Synonyms
- Turbinella taitensis Lesson, 1842

Species of gastropod

Peristernia taitensis is a species of sea snail, a marine gastropod mollusk in the family Fasciolariidae, the spindle snails, the tulip snails and their allies.
