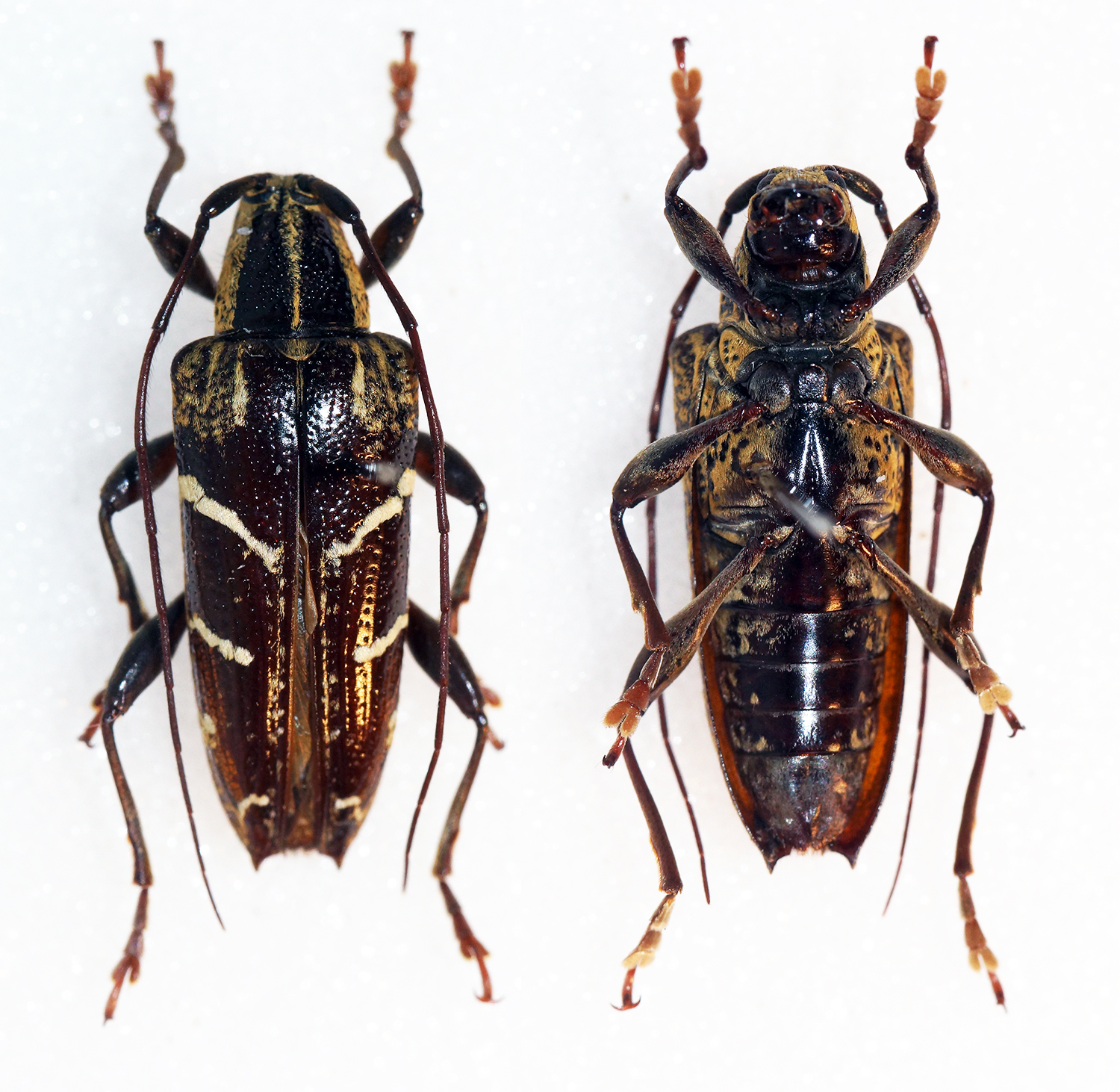

Scientific classification
- Kingdom: Animalia
- Phylum: Arthropoda
- Class: Insecta
- Order: Coleoptera
- Suborder: Polyphaga
- Infraorder: Cucujiformia
- Family: Cerambycidae
- Genus: Parepilysta
- Species: P. subfasciata

Binomial name
- Parepilysta subfasciata (Schwarzer, 1931)

= Parepilysta subfasciata =

Species of beetle

Parepilysta subfasciata is a species of beetle in the family Cerambycidae. It was described by Schwarzer in 1931.
