= Peristernia violacea =

Scientific classification
- Kingdom: Animalia
- Phylum: Mollusca
- Class: Gastropoda
- Subclass: Caenogastropoda
- Order: Neogastropoda
- Family: Fasciolariidae
- Genus: Peristernia
- Species: P. violacea

Binomial name
- Peristernia violacea (Reeve, 1847)

Synonyms
- Turbinella violacea Reeve, 1847

Species of gastropod

Peristernia violacea is a species of sea snail, a marine gastropod mollusk in the family Fasciolariidae, the spindle snails, the tulip snails and their allies. It is characterized by a silver or gold periostracum that is iridescent when wet, and a deep violet aperture. It is possibly endemic to the Line Islands, and is recorded from Palmyra, Kiritimati, and other nearby islands, although collections from the Andaman Islands have been tentatively identified as this species.

== Description ==
Fairly small, 20 to 35 mm in length. Characterized by a silver or gold periostracum that is iridescent when wet, and violet aperture. Pease referred to the iridescence as greenish silver.

== Distribution ==
Line Islands, Palmyra and eastern Kiribati. Additional specimens tentatively identified as this species recorded from Andaman Islands, a distribution gap of approximately 7,500 miles (over 12,000 km) if correct. Alain Robin's "Compendium of Marine Gastropods" correctly illustrates the species, but the illustrated specimen is from Christmas Island, Kiribati, not from the Andaman Islands as stated in the text.
