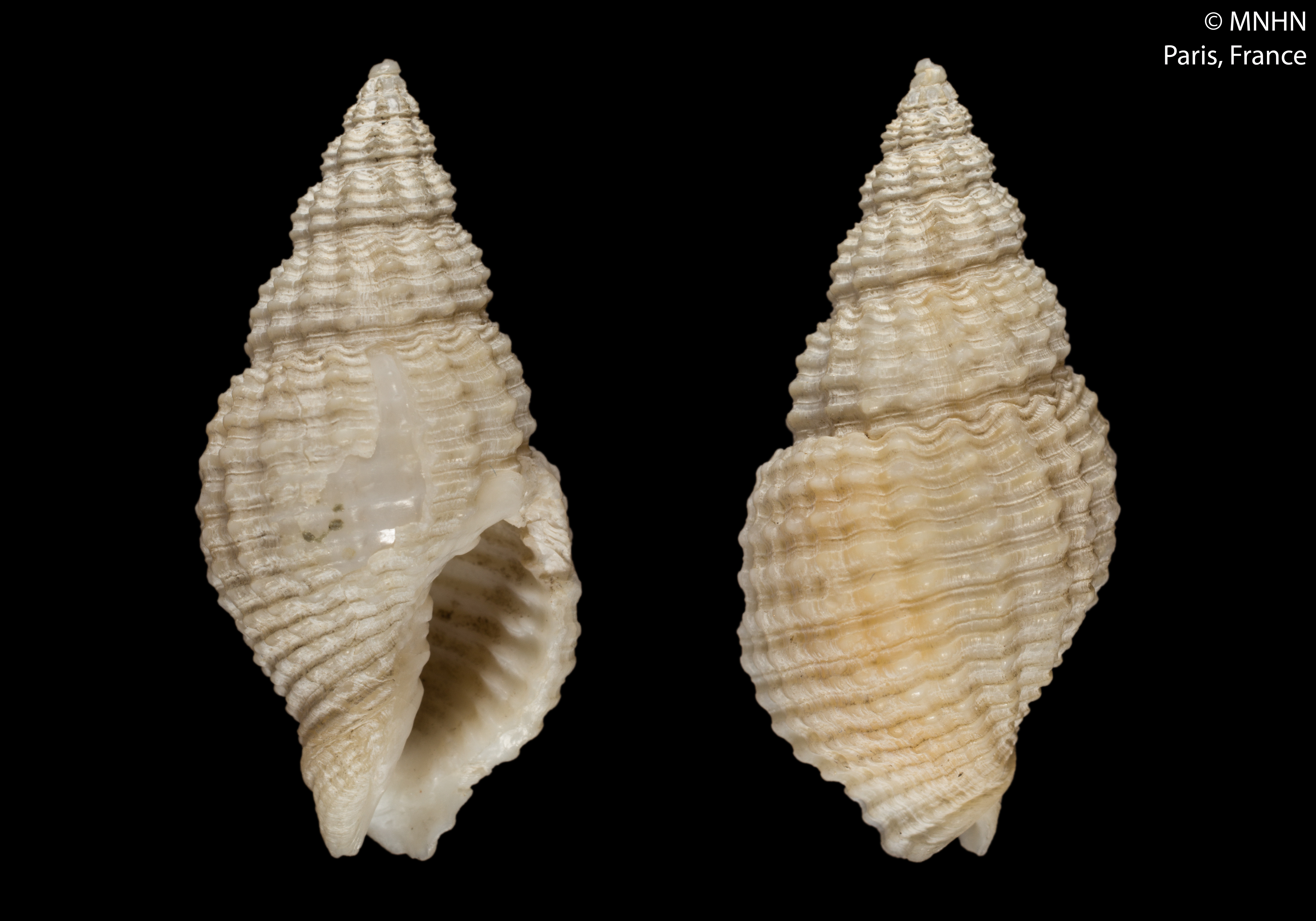
- Shell of Peristernia clathrata (holotype at MNHN, Paris)

Scientific classification
- Kingdom: Animalia
- Phylum: Mollusca
- Class: Gastropoda
- Subclass: Caenogastropoda
- Order: Neogastropoda
- Family: Fasciolariidae
- Genus: Peristernia
- Species: P. clathrata

Binomial name
- Peristernia clathrata (Valenciennes, 1840)

Synonyms
- Turbinella clathrata Valenciennes, 1840

= Peristernia clathrata =

Species of gastropod

Peristernia clathrata is a species of sea snail, a marine gastropod mollusk in the family Fasciolariidae, the spindle snails, the tulip snails and their allies.

== Description ==
The length of the shell attains 26.8 mm.
