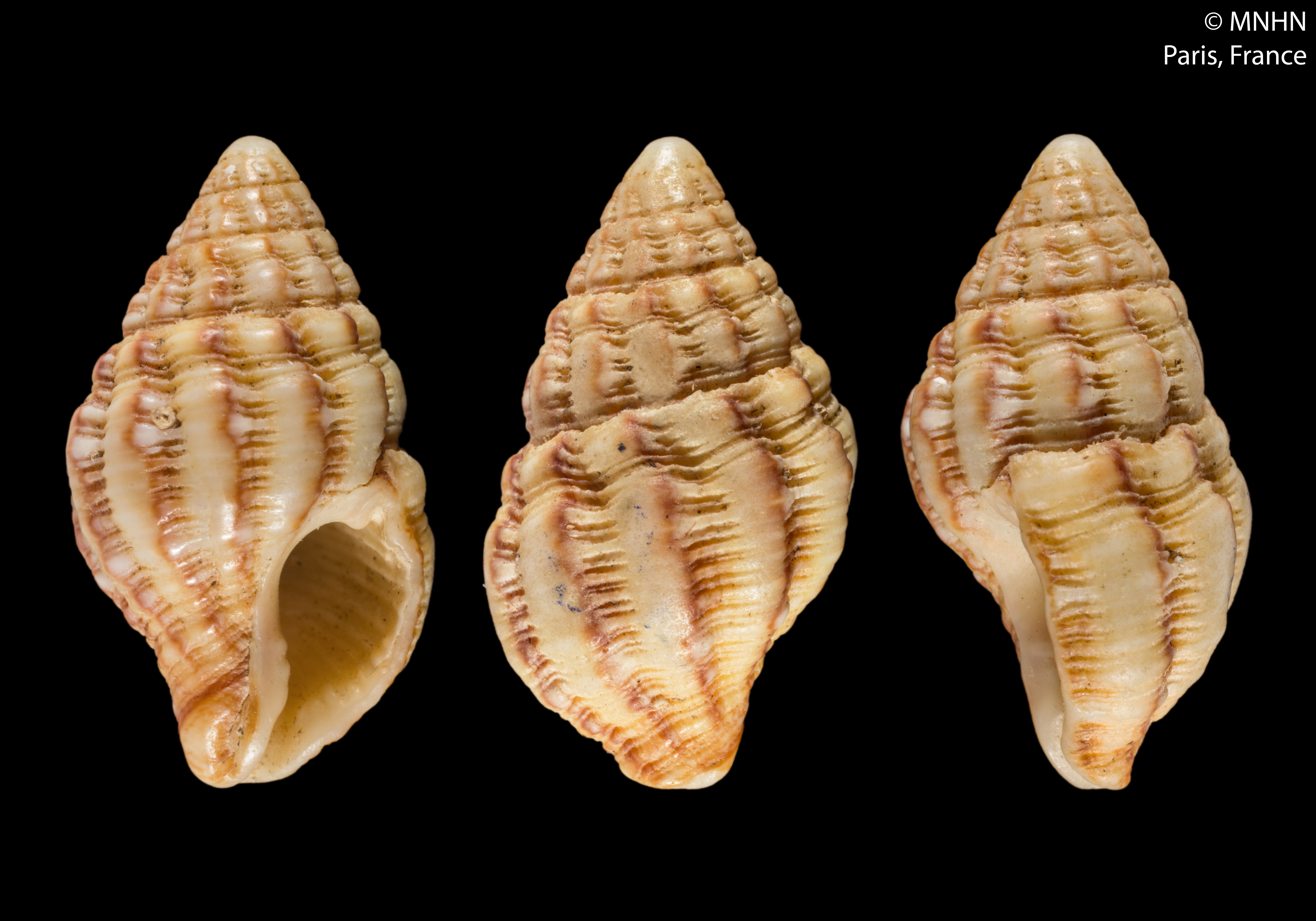
- Shell of Peristernia tulipa (syntype at MNHN, Paris)

Scientific classification
- Kingdom: Animalia
- Phylum: Mollusca
- Class: Gastropoda
- Subclass: Caenogastropoda
- Order: Neogastropoda
- Family: Fasciolariidae
- Genus: Peristernia
- Species: P. tulipa

Binomial name
- Peristernia tulipa (Lesson, 1841)

Synonyms
- Buccinum tulipa Lesson, 1841

= Peristernia tulipa =

Species of gastropod

Peristernia tulipa is a species of sea snail, a marine gastropod mollusk in the family Fasciolariidae, the spindle snails, the tulip snails and their allies.

== Description ==
The length of the shell attains 20.3 mm.It is a voracious predator that eats little invertebrates or other mollusks. It gets its name from the shape of its shell which resembles a tulip flower. It has a highly variable shell color. The shell variations involve fine spiral lines and irregular large spots. The large spots can be brown, orange, ochre, or reddish-orange. The animal has a brown and oval shaped operculum and the animal itself is reddish or darker red with fine lighter color markings.

== Distribution ==
This species occurs in the Pacific Ocean off Mexico.
