= Peristernia squamosa =

Scientific classification
- Kingdom: Animalia
- Phylum: Mollusca
- Class: Gastropoda
- Subclass: Caenogastropoda
- Order: Neogastropoda
- Family: Fasciolariidae
- Genus: Peristernia
- Species: P. squamosa

Binomial name
- Peristernia squamosa (Pease, 1863)

Synonyms
- Latirus squamosus Pease, 1863

Species of gastropod

Peristernia squamosa is a species of sea snail, a marine gastropod mollusk in the family Fasciolariidae, the spindle snails, the tulip snails and their allies.
