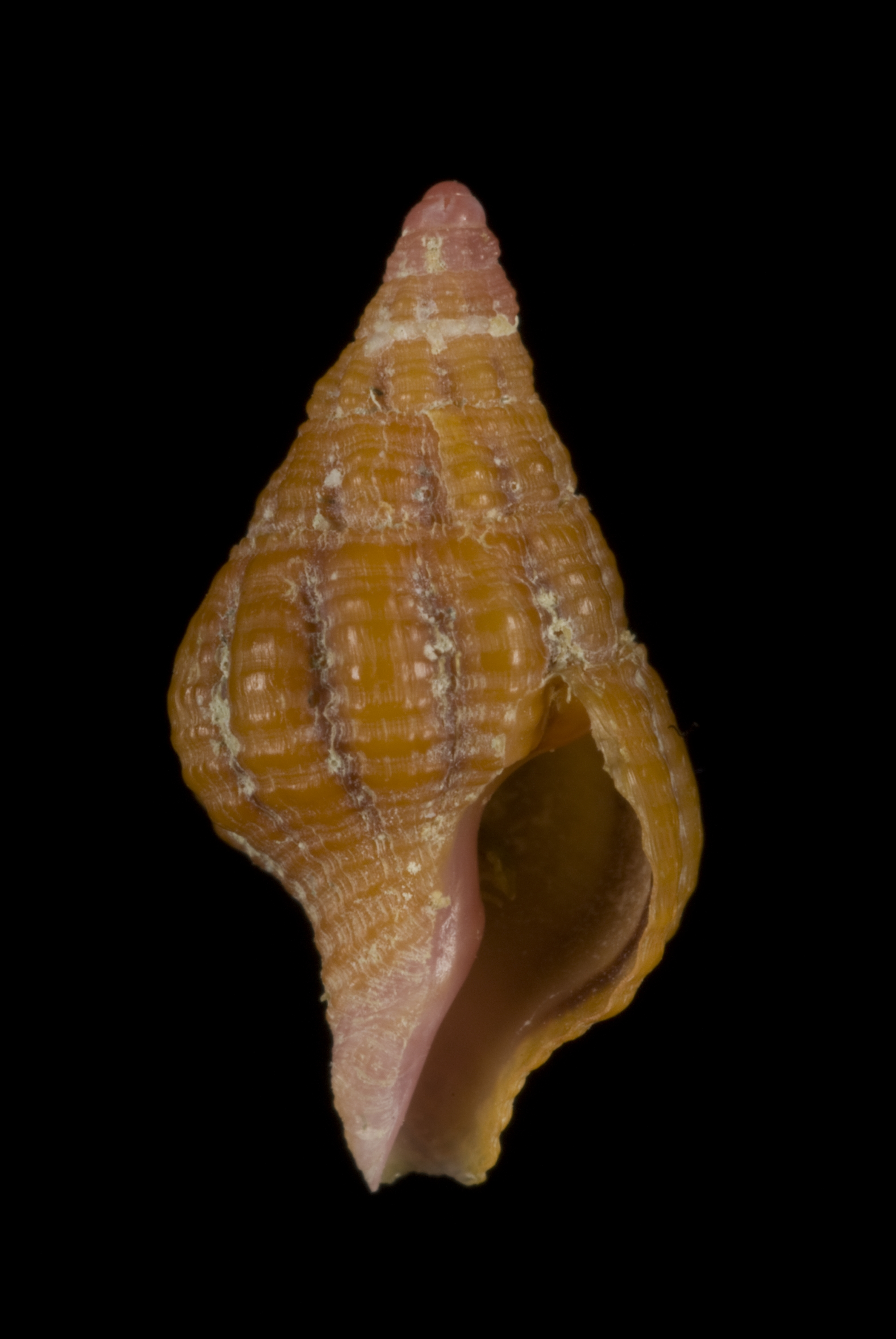
- Shell of Peristernia reincarnata (specimen at MNHN, Paris)

Scientific classification
- Kingdom: Animalia
- Phylum: Mollusca
- Class: Gastropoda
- Subclass: Caenogastropoda
- Order: Neogastropoda
- Family: Fasciolariidae
- Genus: Peristernia
- Species: P. reincarnata

Binomial name
- Peristernia reincarnata Snyder, 2000

Synonyms
- Peristernia incarnata sensu Kiener, 1840

= Peristernia reincarnata =

Species of gastropod

Peristernia reincarnata is a species of sea snail, a marine gastropod mollusk in the family Fasciolariidae, the spindle snails, the tulip snails and their allies.

== Description ==
The shell size varies between 18 mm and 34 mm and has a maximum width of 11.8 mm.

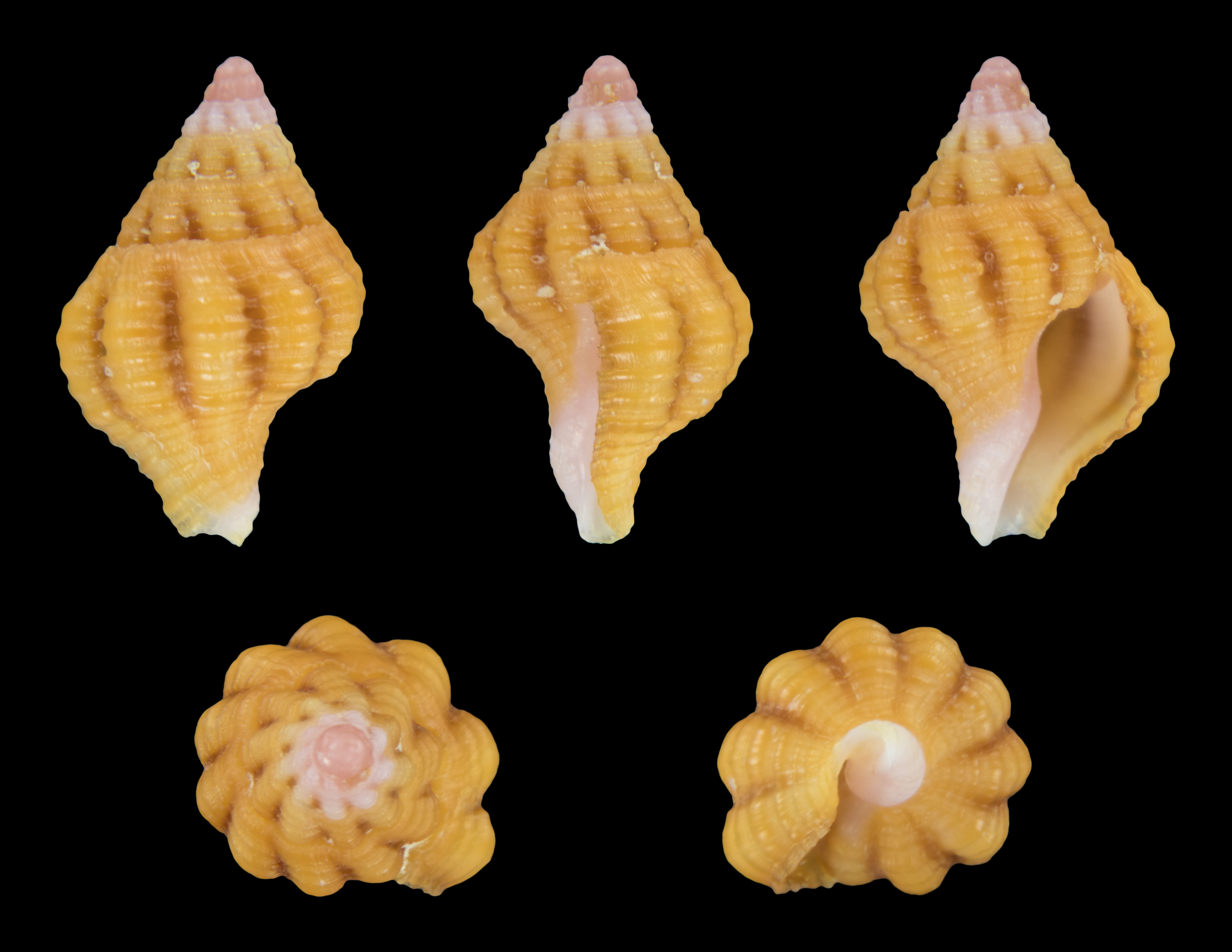
Juvenile

== Distribution ==
This species can be found in the Red Sea, the Indian Ocean and in the Pacific Ocean off the Philippines, Papua New Guinea, the Northern Territory and Western Australia.
