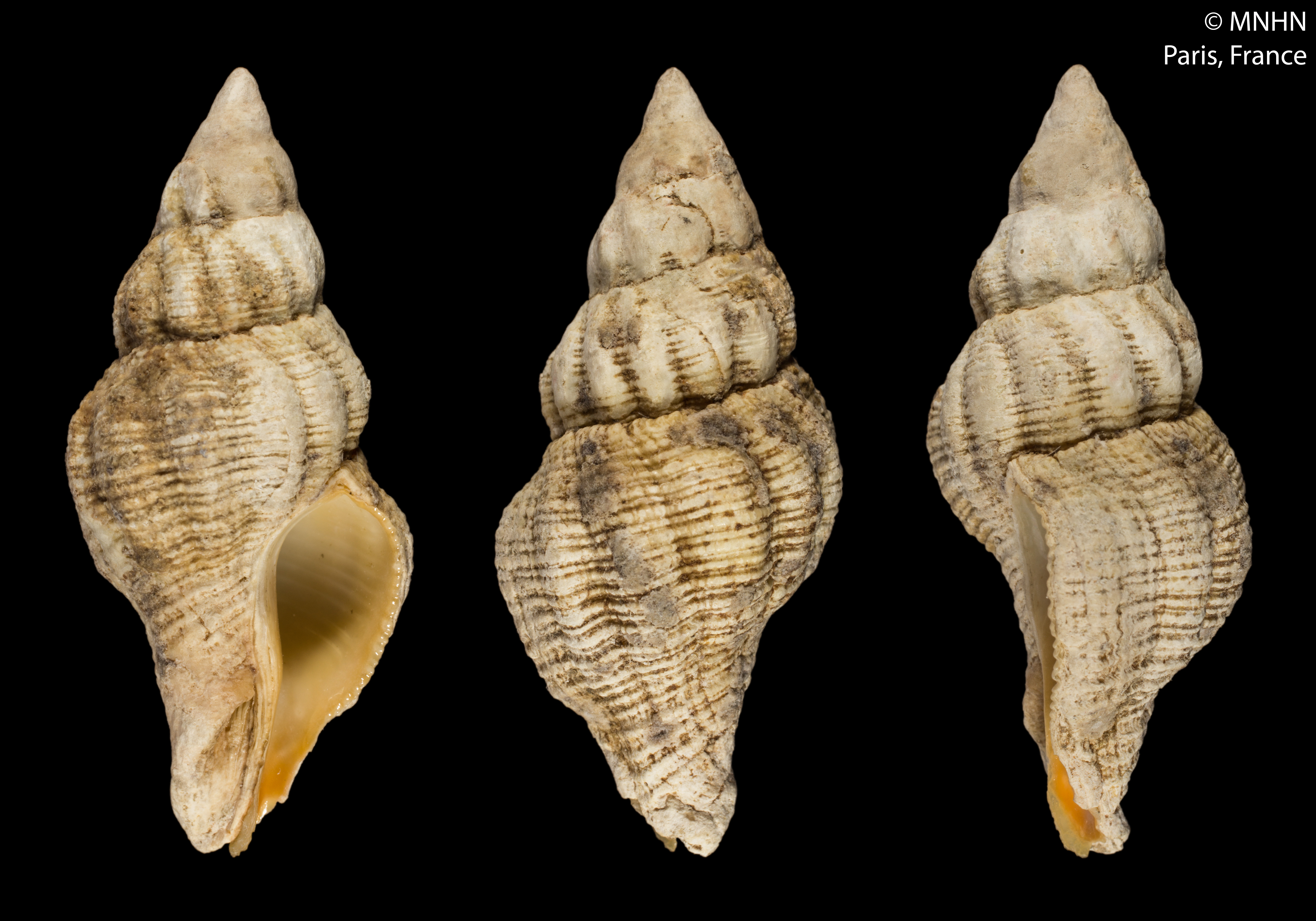
- Shell of Peristernia rollandi (syntype at MNHN, Paris)

Scientific classification
- Kingdom: Animalia
- Phylum: Mollusca
- Class: Gastropoda
- Subclass: Caenogastropoda
- Order: Neogastropoda
- Family: Fasciolariidae
- Genus: Peristernia
- Species: P. rollandi

Binomial name
- Peristernia rollandi (Bernardi & Crosse, 1861)

Synonyms
- Plicatella rollandi (Bernardi & Crosse, 1861); Turbinella rollandi Bernardi & Crosse, 1861

= Peristernia rollandi =

Species of gastropod

Peristernia rollandi is a species of sea snail, a marine gastropod mollusk in the family Fasciolariidae, the spindle snails, the tulip snails and their allies.

== Description ==
The length of the shell attains 42.3 mm.

== Distribution ==
This marine species occurs off New Caledonia.
