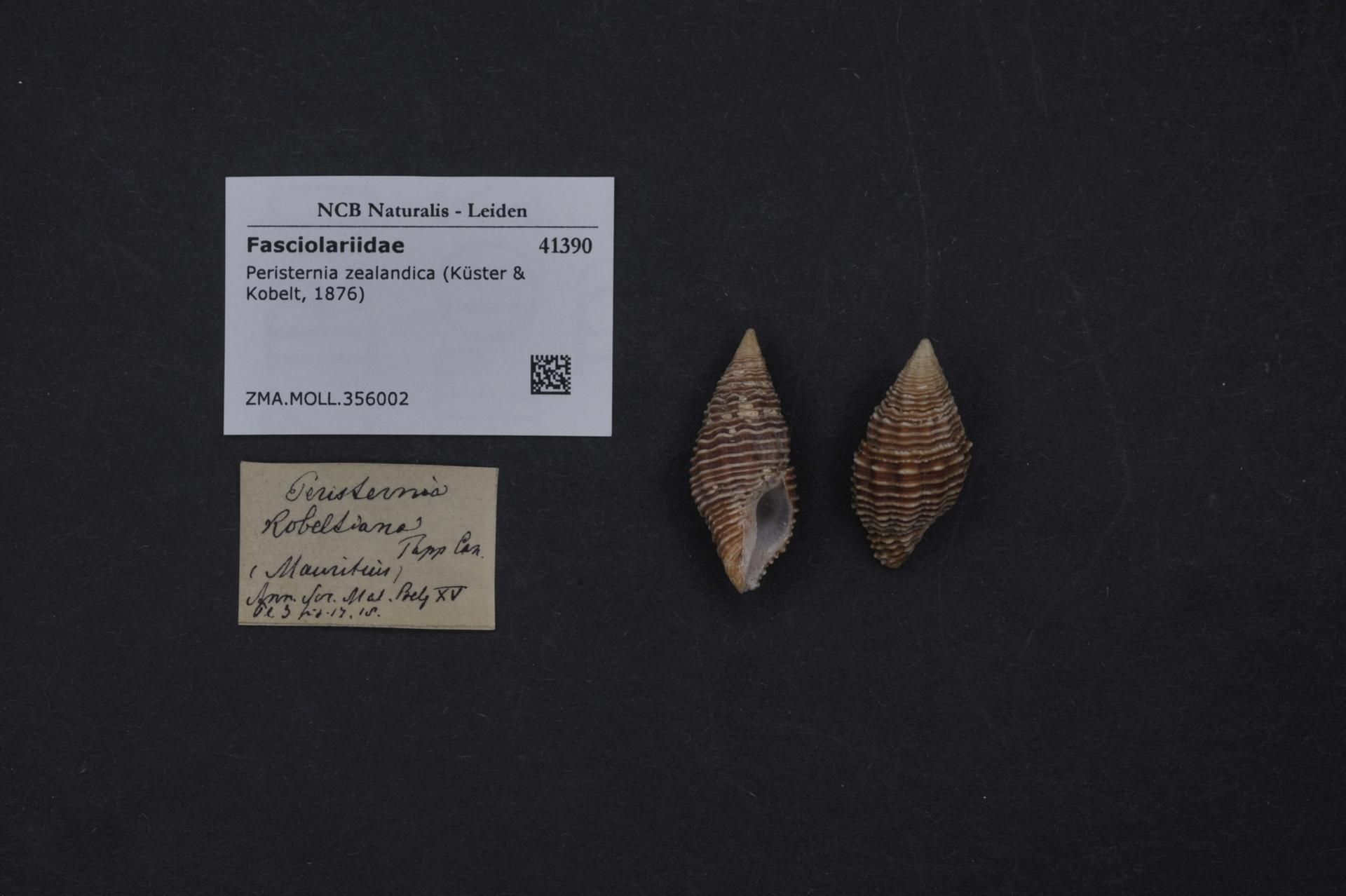

Scientific classification
- Kingdom: Animalia
- Phylum: Mollusca
- Class: Gastropoda
- Subclass: Caenogastropoda
- Order: Neogastropoda
- Family: Fasciolariidae
- Genus: Benimakia
- Species: B. rubens

Binomial name
- Benimakia rubens (Lamarck, 1822)

Synonyms
- Fusus rubens Lamarck, 1822 (original combination); Peristernia kobeltiana Tapparone-Canefri, 1879 (unjustified replacement); Peristernia rubens (Lamarck, 1822); Peristernia zealandica (Küster & Kobelt, 1876); Turbinella zealandica Küster & Kobelt, 1876

= Benimakia rubens =

Species of gastropod

Benimakia rubens is a species of sea snail, a marine gastropod mollusc in the family Fasciolariidae, the spindle snails, the tulip snails, and their allies.

== Description ==
The length of the shell attains 25 mm.

== Distribution ==
This species occurs in the Indian Ocean off Mauritius.
