= Peristernia granulosa =

Scientific classification
- Kingdom: Animalia
- Phylum: Mollusca
- Class: Gastropoda
- Subclass: Caenogastropoda
- Order: Neogastropoda
- Family: Fasciolariidae
- Genus: Peristernia
- Species: P. granulosa

Binomial name
- Peristernia granulosa (Pease, 1868)

Synonyms
- Latirus granulosa Pease, 1868

Species of gastropod

Peristernia granulosa is a species of sea snail, a marine gastropod mollusk in the family Fasciolariidae, the spindle snails, the tulip snails and their allies.
