= Cesare Maria Tapparone-Canefri =

Italian malacologist (1838–1891)

- Born: c. 1838
- Died: 6 August 1891 (aged 52–53); Quattordio, Italy
- Scientific career
- Fields: malacology

Cesare Maria Tapparone-Canefri (c. 1838– 6 August 1891, Quattordio, Italy) was an Italian malacologist.

== Bibliography ==
- Tapparone-Canefri C. M. (1873). "Intorno ad una nuova specie di Nephrops genere di Crostacei Decapodi Macruri". Memorie R. Accademia Scienze Torino (2)27: 325–329, 1 plate.
- Tapparone-Canefri C. M. (1875). "Viaggio dei signori O. Antinori, O. Beccari ed A. Issel nel mar Rosso, nel territorio del Bogos, e regioni circostanti durante gli anni 1870–1871. Studio monografico sopra i Muricidi del mar Rosso". Annali del Museo Civico di Storia Naturale di Genova 7: 569–630.
- Tapparone-Canefri C. M. (1876). "Contribuzioni per una fauna malacologica della Isole Papuane. III. Molluschi della Baia di Geelwinck inviati dai sig. O. Beccari, L.M. D'Albertis e A.A. Bruijn". Annali del Museo Civico di Storia Naturale di Genova 8: 323–332.
- Tapparone-Canefri C. M. (1878). "Description d'un genre nouveau de Mollusque terrestre provenant de la Nouvelle-Guinée". Journal de Conchyliologie 26: 169-170.
- Tapparone-Canefri C. M. (1879). "Museum Pauluccianum. Etudes malacologiques". Journal de Conchyliologie 27: 316–327.
- Tapparone-Canefri C. M. 1880. "Glanures dans la faune malacologique de I'Île Maurice. Catalogue de la famille des Muricidés (Woodward)". Annales de la Société Malacologique de Belgique 15(1): 1–100, pls. 2, 3. (Also issued as a separate, Bruxelles, 1881).
- Tapparone-Canefri C. M. (1882). "Museum Pauluccianum. Études malacologiques". Journal de Conchyliologie 30: 22–37.
- Tapparone-Canefri C. M. (1883). Fauna malacologica délia Nuova Guinea. Molluschi estramarini.
- Tapparone-Canefri C. M. (1883–1884). Intorno ad alcuni Molluschi terrestri delle Molucche et di Selebes.
- Tapparone-Canefri C. M. (1886). Fauna malacologica della Nuova Guinea e delle Isole adiacenti. Supplemento, I.
- Tapparone-Canefri C. M. (1889). Viaggio di Leonardo Fea in Birmania e regioni vicine. XVIII. Molluschi terrestri e d'acqua dolce.
