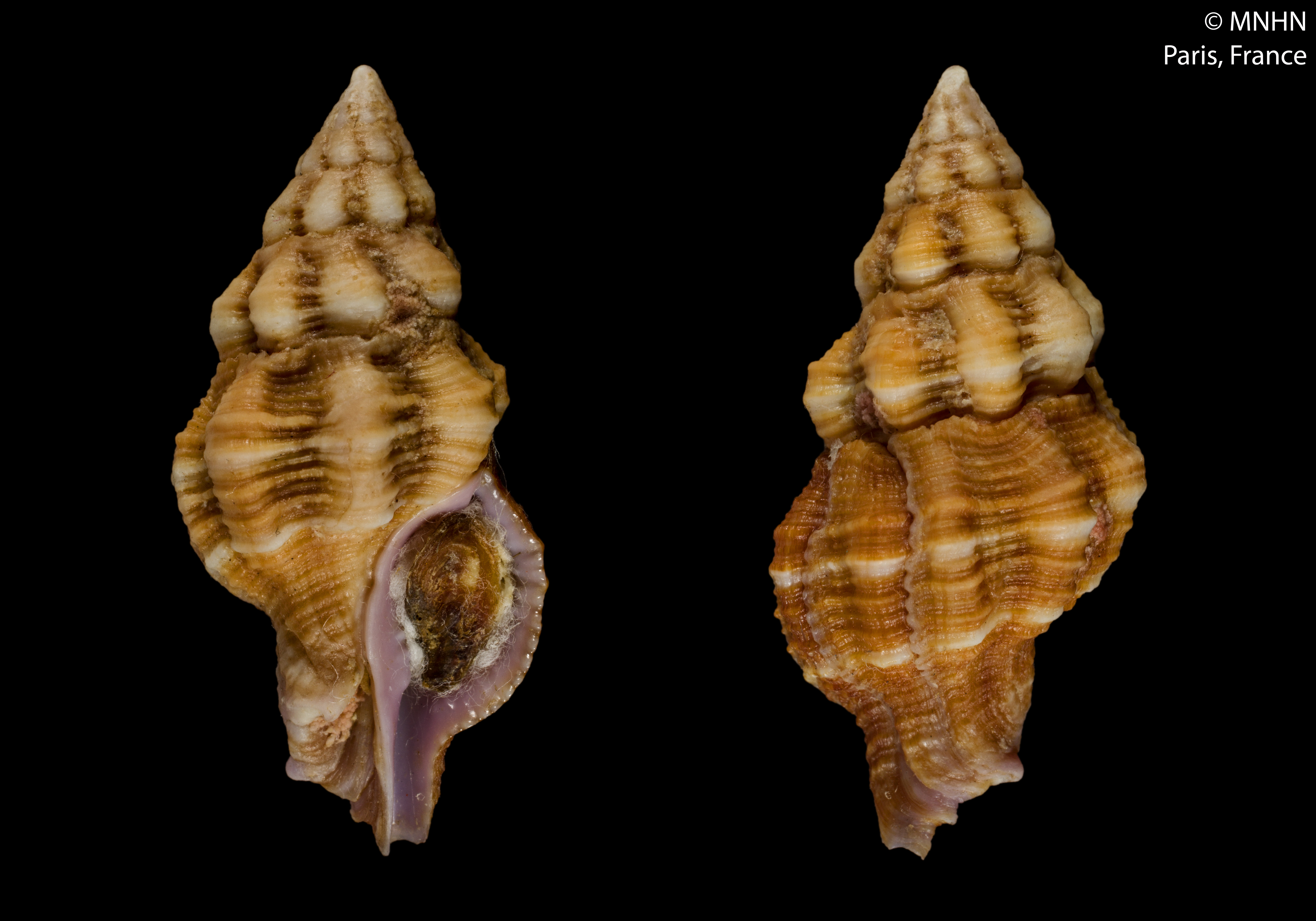
- Shell of Latirus anosyanus (holotype at MNHN, Paris)

Scientific classification
- Kingdom: Animalia
- Phylum: Mollusca
- Class: Gastropoda
- Subclass: Caenogastropoda
- Order: Neogastropoda
- Superfamily: Buccinoidea
- Family: Fasciolariidae
- Genus: Latirus; Montfort, 1810

Type species
- Latirus aurantiacus Montfort, 1810

Synonyms
- Cymatium Link, 1807 (jun. homonym of Cymatium Röding, 1798 / actually placed in synonymy with subgenus Latirus (Plicatella) H. Adams & A. Adams, 1853); Lathyrus Schinz, 1825; Latyrus Carpenter, 1857

= Latirus =

Genus of gastropods

Latirus is a genus of sea snails, marine gastropod molluscs in the family Fasciolariidae, the spindle snails, the tulip snails and their allies.

== Description ==
The turreted shell is fusiform and is umbilicate. The spire is produced with nodulous whorls. The aperture is oval-oblong. The outer lip is thin and crenulated. The columella is straight, with two or three small oblique plaits in front.

== Species ==
Species within the genus Latirus include:

- Latirus abnormis G.B. Sowerby III, 1849
- Latirus acuminatus (Kiener, 1840)
- Latirus alboapicatus Smith, 1902
- Latirus amplustre (Dillwyn, 1817)
- Latirus andamanicus Smith, 1894
- Latirus anosyanus Bozzetti, 2018
- Latirus barclayi (Reeve, 1847)
- Latirus belcheri (Reeve, 1847)
- Latirus castaneus (Gray, 1839)
- Latirus constrictus (Koch, 1845)
- Latirus deynzerorum Emerson & Sage, 1990
- † Latirus elachistus Lozouet, 1999
- Latirus elegans Adams, 1855
- Latirus fallax (Küster & Kobelt, 1874)
- Latirus fenestratus (Anton, 1838) (nomen dubium)
- Latirus filamentosus (Küster & Kobelt, 1874)
- Latirus filmerae (G.B. Sowerby III, 1900)
- Latirus gibbulus (Gmelin, 1791)
- Latirus granatus (Koch, 1845)
- Latirus hesterae Melvill, 1891
- Latirus impressus (Anton, 1838) (nomen dubium)
- † Latirus lhommei Staadt, 1908
- Latirus lignosus (Gmelin, 1791)
- Latirus maculatus (Reeve, 1847)
- Latirus mannophorus (Melvill, 1891)
- Latirus marrowi Lyons & Snyder, 2015
- Latirus maxwelli (Pilsbry, 1939)
- Latirus meli Bozzetti, 2014
- † Latirus metalleus Lozouet, 1999
- Latirus minutisquamosus (Reeve, 1848)
- Latirus modestus (Philippi, 1844)
- Latirus nassoides (Reeve, 1847)
- Latirus niger Odhner, 1917
- Latirus ornatus Lyons & Snyder, 2015
- Latirus philberti (Récluz, 1844)
- Latirus philippinensis Snyder, 2003
- Latirus pictus (Reeve, 1847)
- Latirus plicatulus (Anton, 1838) (nomen dubium)
- Latirus polygonus (Gmelin, 1791)
- Latirus poppei Lyons & Snyder, 2015
- † Latirus pseudoaturensis Lozouet, 1999
- Latirus pulleini Verco, 1895
- Latirus purpuroides (Lesson, 1842)
- Latirus rhodostoma (Adams, 1855)
- Latirus rousi G.B. Sowerby III, 1886
- Latirus rufus (Reeve, 1848)
- Latirus rugosissimus (Locard, 1897)
- Latirus singularis G.B. Sowerby III, 1903
- Latirus spinosus (Philippi, 1845)
- Latirus spirorbulus (Menke, 1829)
- Latirus stenomphalus Habe & Kosuge, 1966
- Latirus strangei (Adams, 1855)
- Latirus tenuistratus Sowerby
- Latirus tigroides Kilburn, 1975
- Latirus troscheli Löbbecke, 1882
- Latirus vexillulum (Reeve, 1842)
- Latirus vischii Bozzetti, 2008
- Latirus walkeri Melvill, 1894
- Latirus williamlyonsi Petuch & Sargent, 2011
- Latirus xantochrous (Tapparone-Canefri, 1881)

Species brought into synonymy

- Latirus abbotti Snyder, 2003: synonym of Polygona abbotti
- Latirus aldeynzeri Garcia, 2001: synonym of Hemipolygona aldeynzeri
- Latirus anapetes Woodring, 1964: synonym of Polygona anapetes (Woodring, 1964)
- Latirus angulatus (Röding, 1798): synonym of Polygona angulata
- Latirus annulata Röding, 1798: synonym of Pustulatirus annulatus
- Latirus armatus Adams A., 1854: synonym of Hemipolygona armata
- Latirus attenuata (Reeve, 1847): synonym of Pustulatirus attenuatus (Reeve, 1847)
- Latirus aurantiacus Montfort, 1810: synonym of Latirus gibbulus (Gmelin, 1791)
- Latirus australiensis Reeve: synonym of Peristernia australiensis
- Latirus bairstowi G.B. Sowerby III, 1886: synonym of Dolicholatirus bairstowi
- Latirus balicasagensis Bozzetti, 1997: synonym of Fusolatirus balicasagensis
- Latirus bayeri Petuch, 2001: synonym of Polygona bayeri
- Latirus beckyae Snyder, 2000: synonym of Hemipolygona beckyae
- Latirus bernadensis Bullock, 1947: synonym of Polygona bernadensis (Bullock, 1974) (original combination)
- Latirus bonnieae Smythe, 1985: synonym of Hemipolygona bonnieae
- Latirus brazieri Angas: synonym of Nodopelagia brazieri
- Latirus brinkae Lussi, 1996: synonym of Fusolatirus brinkae (Lussi, 1996) (original combination)
- Latirus candelabrum (Reeve, 1847): synonym of Latirus philberti (Récluz, 1844)
- Latirus carinifer (Lamarck, 1816): synonym of Hemipolygona carinifera
- Latirus carotianus Tapparone-Canefri, 1879: synonym of Peristernia carotiana (Tapparone Canefri, 1881) (original combination)
- Latirus carpentariensis Hedley, 1812: synonym of Fusolatirus paetelianus (Kobelt, 1874) (junior synonym)
- Latirus centrifugus (Dall, 1915): synonym of Hemipolygona centrifuga
- Latirus clausicaudatus (Hinds, 1844): synonym of Crassibougia clausicaudata (Hinds, 1844)
- Latirus cloveri Snyder, 2003: synonym of Fusolatirus suduirauti
- Latirus clovery Snyder, 2003 : wrong spelling of Latirus cloveri
- Latirus concentrica (Reeve, 1847): synonym of Polygona concentrica
- Latirus concinnus Tapparone-Canefri, 1880: synonym of Latirus maculatus var. concinna Tapparone-Canefri, 1880
- Latirus cuna Petuch, 1990: synonym of Hemipolygona cuna
- Latirus devyanae Rios, Costa & Calvo, 1994: synonym of Polygona devyanae (Rios, Costa & Calvo, 1994)
- Latirus elsiae Kilburn, 1975: synonym of Fusolatirus elsiae
- Latirus eppi Melvill, 1891: synonym of Pustulatirus eppi
- Latirus ernesti Melvill, 1910: synonym of Teralatirus ernesti
- Latirus fastigium (Reeve, 1847): synonym of Benimakia fastigium (Reeve, 1847)
- Latirus filosa (Schubert & Wagner, 1829): wrong name for Latirus filosus
- Latirus filosus (Schubert & Wagner, 1829): synonym of Polygona filosa
- Latirus flavidus Adams, 1855: synonym of Benimakia flavida (A. Adams, 1855) (original combination)
- Latirus formosior Melvill, 1891: synonym of Fusolatirus formosior
- Latirus hemphilli Hertlein & Strong, 1951: synonym of Pustulatirus hemphilli
- Latirus infundibulum (Gmelin, 1791): synonym of Polygona infundibula
- Latirus iris (Lightfoot, 1786): synonym of Turrilatirus iris
- Latirus jucundus McGinty, 1940: synonym of Polygona jucunda
- Latirus kandai Kuroda, 1950: synonym of Fusolatirus kandai
- Latirus labronicus (Monterosato, 1884): synonym of Fusinus labronicus
- Latirus lacteum Matthews-Cascou, Matthews & Rocha, 1991: synonym of Polygona lactea
- Latirus lanceolatus (Reeve, 1847): synonym of Benimakia lanceolata (Reeve, 1847)
- Latirus lautus (Reeve, 1847): synonym of Turrilatirus lautus (Reeve, 1847)
- Latirus martini Snyder, 1988: synonym of Polygona martini
- Latirus maximus G. B. Sowerby, 1893: synonym of Viridifusus maximus (G.B. Sowerby III, 1893)
- Latirus mcmurrayi Clench & Aguayo, 1941: synonym of Bullockus mcmurrayi (Clench & Aguayo, 1941)
- Latirus mediamericanus Hertlein & Strong, 1951: synonym of Pustulatirus mediamericanus
- Latirus mollis (G.B. Sowerby III, 1913): synonym of Viridifusus mollis (G. B. Sowerby III, 1913)
- Latirus mosselensis Tomlin, 1932: synonym of Hemipolygona mosselensis
- Latirus nassatula Lamarck: synonym of Peristernia nassatula
- Latirus nematus Woodring, 1928: synonym of Polygona nemata (Woodring, 1928)
- Latirus ogum Petuch, 1979: synonym of Pustulatirus ogum (Petuch, 1979)
- Latirus praestantior Melvill, 1892: synonym of Pustulatirus praestantior
- Latirus profetai (Nofroni, 1982): synonym of Fusinus profetai
- Latirus paeteliana (Küster & Kobelt, 1874): synonym of Fusolatirus paetelianus
- Latirus pagodaeformis (Melvill, 1899): synonym of Fusolatirus pagodaeformis
- Latirus pearsoni Snyder, 2002: synonym of Fusolatirus pearsoni
- Latirus recurvirostra (Schubert & Wagner, 1829): synonym of Hemipolygona recurvirostra
- Latirus rosadoi Bozzetti, 2002: synonym of Benimakia rosadoi (Bozzetti, 2002)
- Latirus rosaponti (Lesson, 1842): synonym of Nodolatirus nodatus (Gmelin, 1791)
- Latirus sanguiflua (Reeve, 1847): synonym of Turrilatirus sanguifluus
- Latirus sanguineus (Wood, 1828): synonym of Pustulatirus sanguineus
- Latirus sarinae Snyder, 2003: synonym of Fusolatirus sarinae
- Latirus socorroensis Hertlein & Strong, 1951: synonym of Polygona socorroensis
- Latirus staminatus Garrard, 1966: synonym of Granulifusus staminatus (Garrard, 1966)
- Latirus suduirauti (Fraussen, 2003): synonym of Fusolatirus suduirauti
- Latirus tumens Carpenter, 1856: synonym of Polygona tumens
- Latirus turritus (Gmelin, 1791): synonym of Turrilatirus turritus
- Latirus unifasciatus (Wood, 1828): synonym of Tarantinaea lignaria (Linnaeus, 1758)
- Latirus varai Bullock, 1970: synonym of Hemipolygona varai
- Latirus vermeiji Petuch, 1986: synonym of Polygona vermeiji (Petuch, 1986)
- Latirus virginensis Abbott, 1958: synonym of Pustulatirus virginensis
