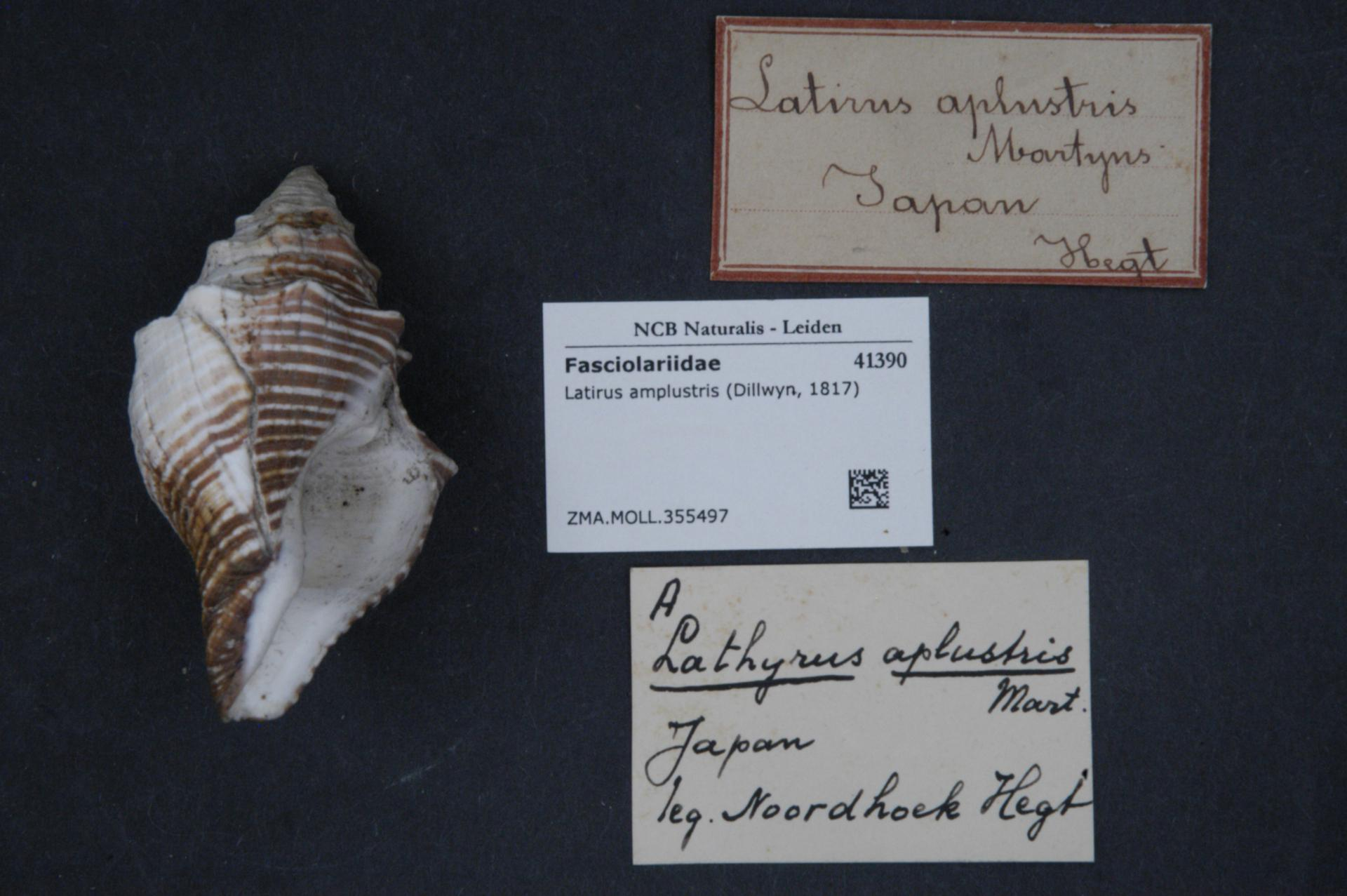

Scientific classification
- Kingdom: Animalia
- Phylum: Mollusca
- Class: Gastropoda
- Subclass: Caenogastropoda
- Order: Neogastropoda
- Family: Fasciolariidae
- Genus: Latirus
- Species: L. amplustre

Binomial name
- Latirus amplustre (Dillwyn, 1817)

Synonyms
- Latirus amplustris [sic] (misspelling); Murex amplustre Dillwyn, 1817; Turbinella amplustre G. B. Sowerby I, 1825 (junior synonym)

= Latirus amplustre =

Species of gastropod

Latirus amplustre is a species of sea snail, a marine gastropod mollusk in the family Fasciolariidae, the spindle snails, the tulip snails and their allies.
