= Latirus nassoides =

Scientific classification
- Kingdom: Animalia
- Phylum: Mollusca
- Class: Gastropoda
- Subclass: Caenogastropoda
- Order: Neogastropoda
- Family: Fasciolariidae
- Genus: Latirus
- Species: L. nassoides

Binomial name
- Latirus nassoides (Reeve, 1847)

Synonyms
- Turbinella nassoides Reeve, 1847

Species of gastropod

Latirus nassoides is a species of sea snail, a marine gastropod mollusc in the family Fasciolariidae, the spindle snails, the tulip snails and their allies.
