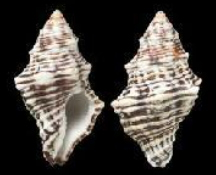

Scientific classification
- Kingdom: Animalia
- Phylum: Mollusca
- Class: Gastropoda
- Subclass: Caenogastropoda
- Order: Neogastropoda
- Family: Fasciolariidae
- Genus: Latirus
- Species: L. vexillulum

Binomial name
- Latirus vexillulum Latirus vexillulum (Reeve, 1842)

Synonyms
- "Turbinella vexillulum" Reeve, 1842; "Turbinellus vexillulum" Reeve, 1842

= Latirus vexillulum =

Species of gastropod

Latirus vexillulum is a species of sea snail, a marine gastropod mollusc in the family Fasciolariidae, the spindle snails, the tulip snails and their allies.

== Description ==
The size of the shell varies up to 50 mm (2.0 in) and is biconic, containing nine whorls.

== Distribution ==
All instances of this marine species have occurred in Caroline Island, Southern Line Islands, Kiribati.
