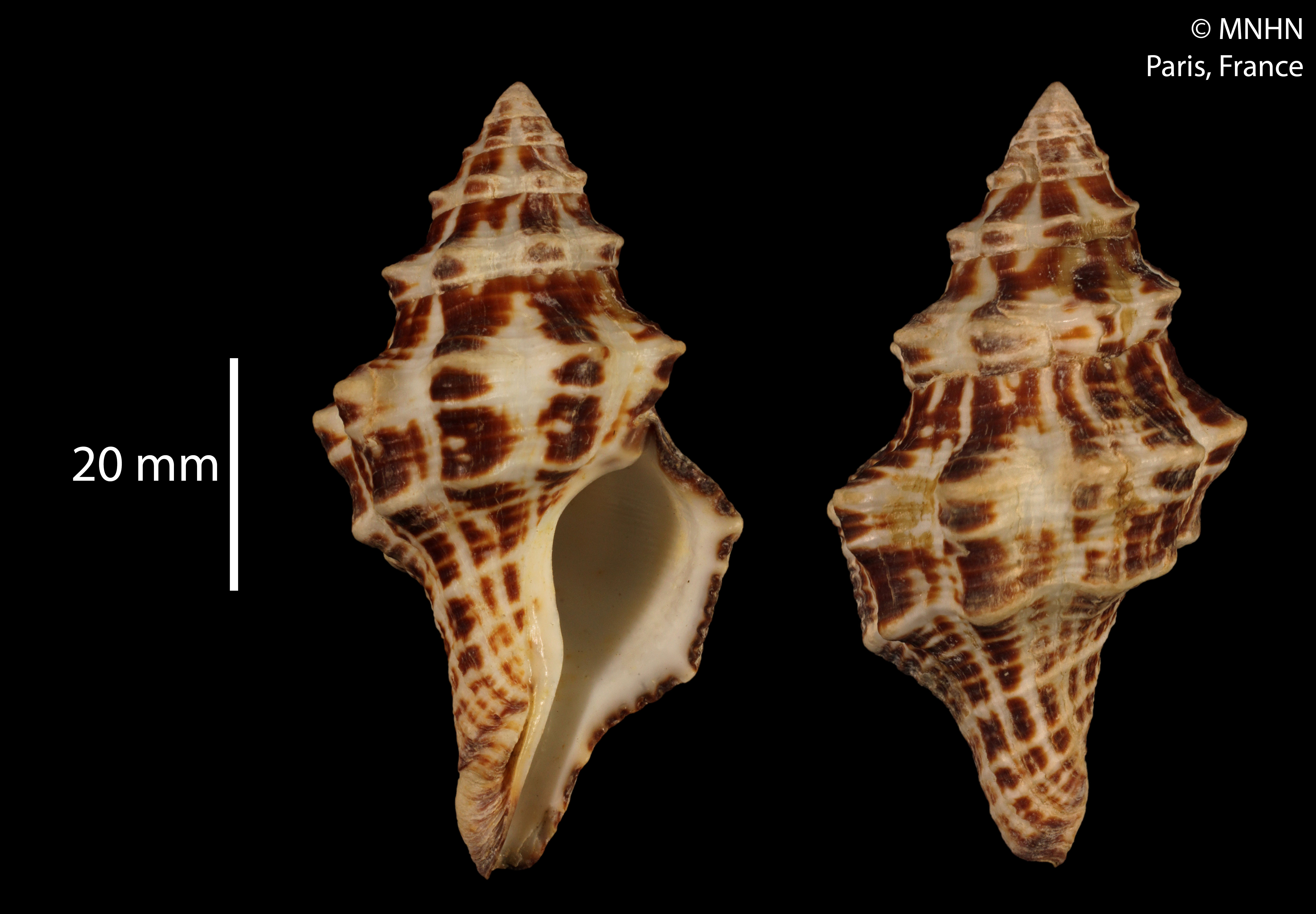

Scientific classification
- Kingdom: Animalia
- Phylum: Mollusca
- Class: Gastropoda
- Subclass: Caenogastropoda
- Order: Neogastropoda
- Family: Fasciolariidae
- Genus: Latirus
- Species: L. marrowi

Binomial name
- Latirus marrowi W. G. Lyons & M. A. Snyder, 2015

= Latirus marrowi =

Species of gastropod

Latirus marrowi is a species of sea snail, a marine gastropod mollusc in the family Fasciolariidae, the spindle snails, the tulip snails and their allies.

== Description ==
The size of the shell varies between 45 mm (1.8 in) and 82 mm (3.2 in).
