= Latirus lignosus =

Scientific classification
- Kingdom: Animalia
- Phylum: Mollusca
- Class: Gastropoda
- Subclass: Caenogastropoda
- Order: Neogastropoda
- Family: Fasciolariidae
- Genus: Latirus
- Species: L. lignosus

Binomial name
- Latirus lignosus (Gmelin, 1791)

Synonyms
- Murex lignosus Gmelin, 1791

Species of gastropod

Latirus lignosus is a species of sea snail, a marine gastropod mollusc in the family Fasciolariidae, the spindle snails, the tulip snails and their allies.
