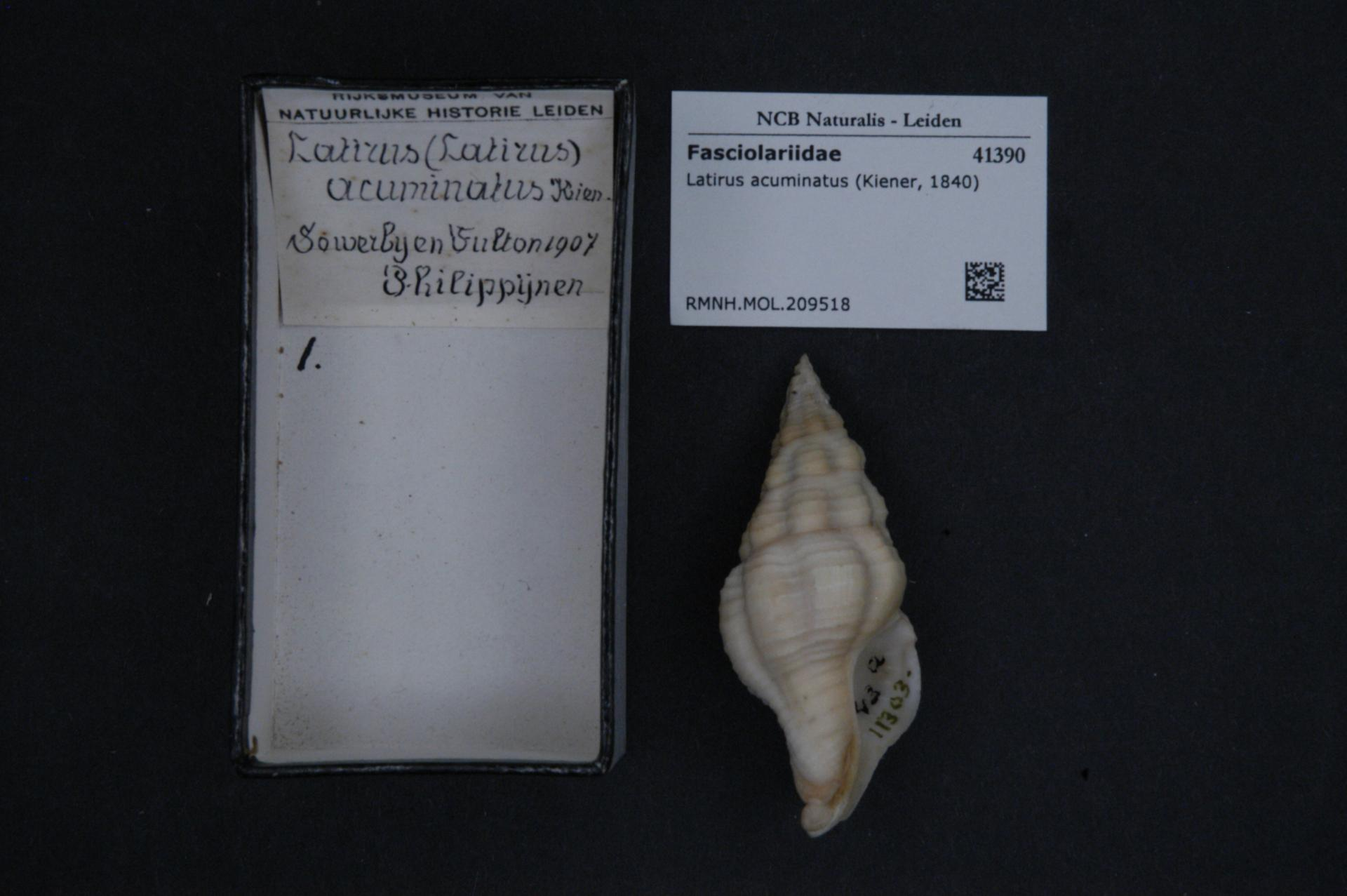

Scientific classification
- Kingdom: Animalia
- Phylum: Mollusca
- Class: Gastropoda
- Subclass: Caenogastropoda
- Order: Neogastropoda
- Family: Fasciolariidae
- Genus: Latirus
- Species: L. acuminatus

Binomial name
- Latirus acuminatus (Kiener, 1840)

Synonyms
- Turbinella acuminata Kiener, 1840

= Latirus acuminatus =

Species of gastropod

Latirus acuminatus is a species of sea snail, a marine gastropod mollusc in the family Fasciolariidae, the spindle snails, the tulip snails and their allies.
