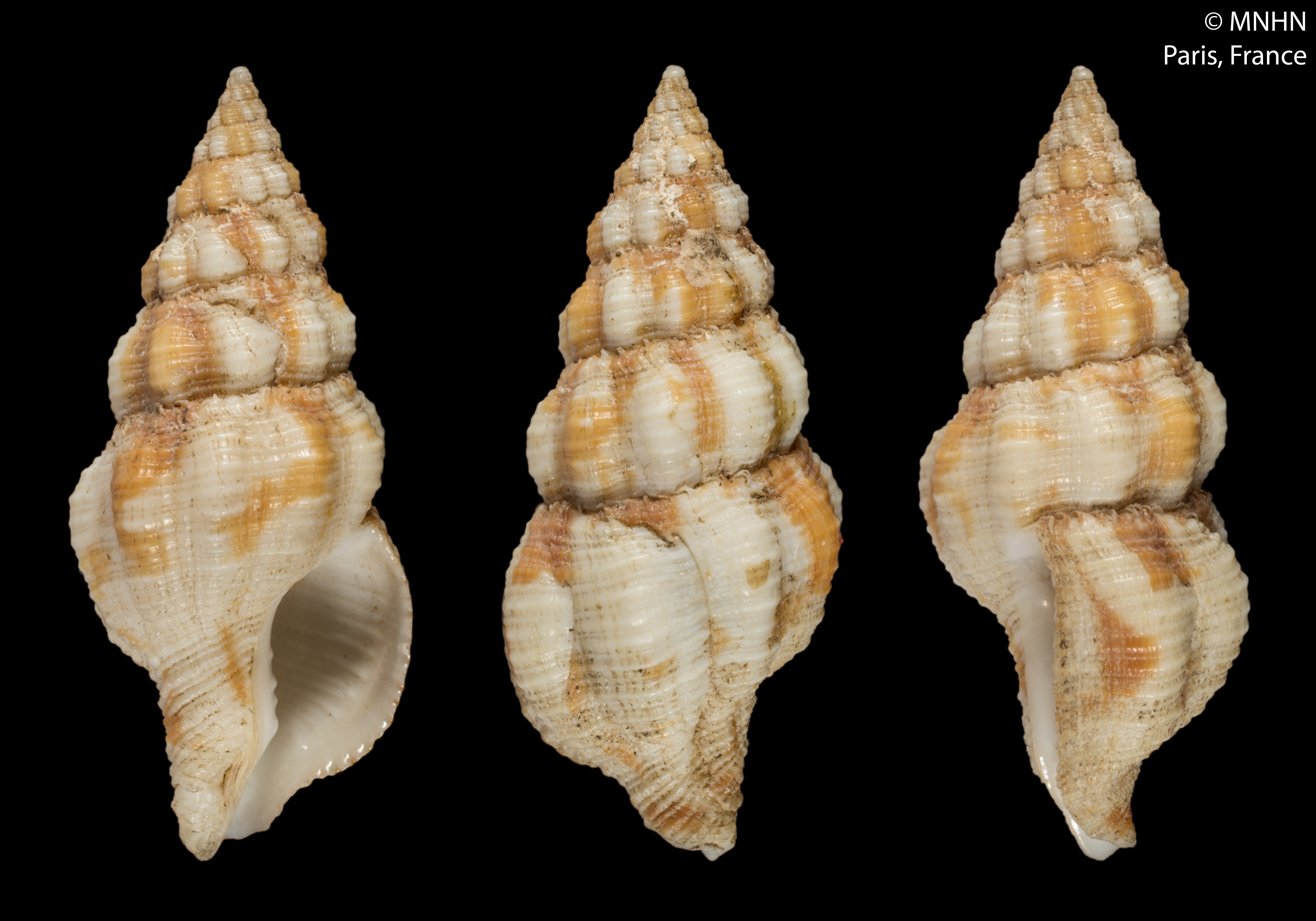
- Shell of Latirus maculatus (holotype at MNHN, Paris)

Scientific classification
- Kingdom: Animalia
- Phylum: Mollusca
- Class: Gastropoda
- Subclass: Caenogastropoda
- Order: Neogastropoda
- Family: Fasciolariidae
- Genus: Latirus
- Species: L. maculatus

Binomial name
- Latirus maculatus (Reeve, 1847)

Synonyms
- Latirus concinnus Tapparone Canefri, 1881; Latirus maculatus var. concinna Tapparone Canefri, 1881; Turbinella maculata Hombron & Jacquinot, 1848 (junior homonym and synonym of Turbinella maculata Reeve, 1847); Turbinella maculata Reeve, 1847

= Latirus maculatus =

Species of gastropod

Latirus maculatus is a species of sea snail, a marine gastropod mollusc in the family Fasciolariidae, the spindle snails, the tulip snails and their allies.

== Subspecies ==
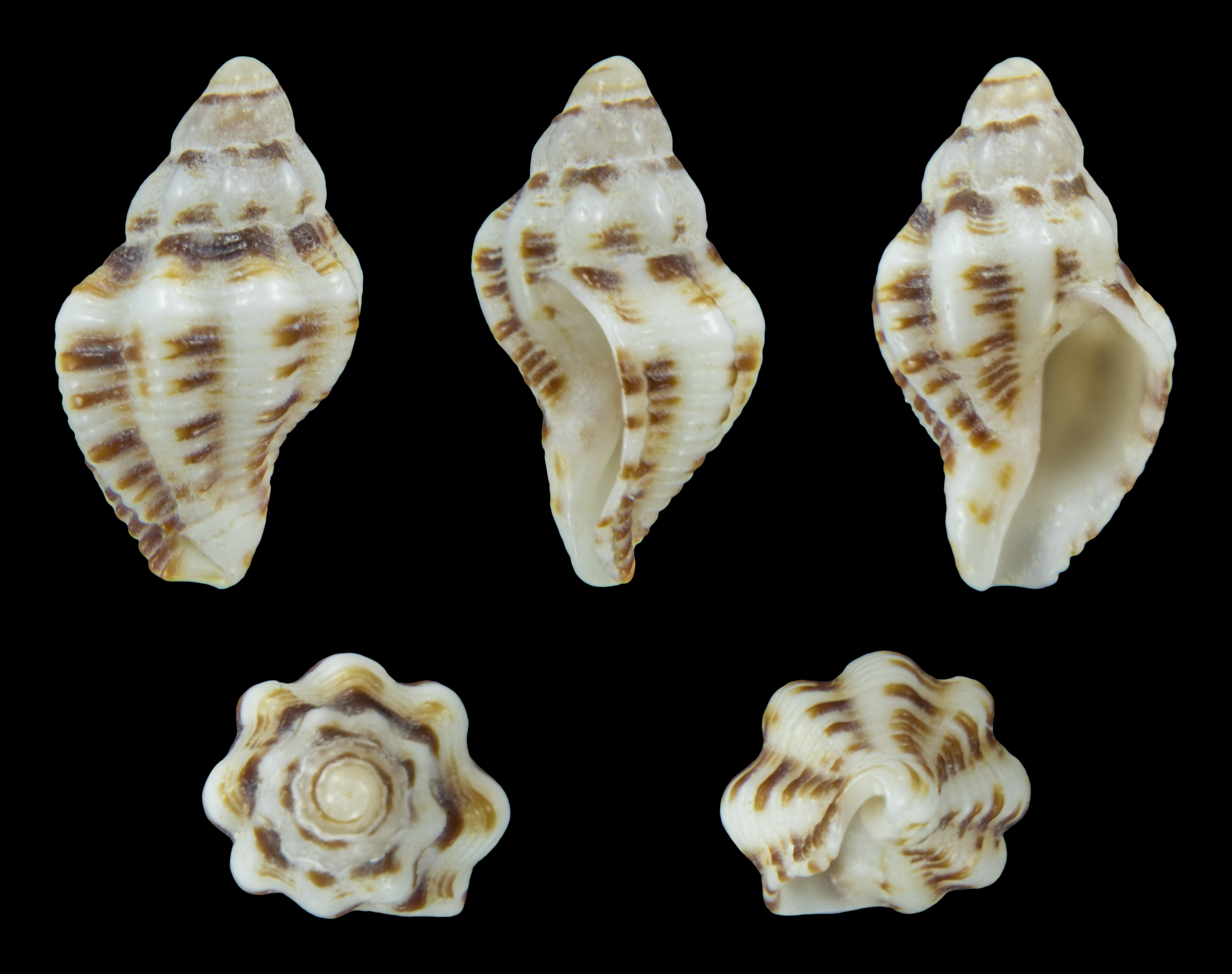
Latirus maculatus var. concinna

- Latirus maculatus var. concinna Tapparone-Canefri, 1880: synonym of Latirus concinnus Tapparone-Canefri, 1880

== Description ==
The length of the shell attains 31.8 mm.

== Distribution ==
This marine species occurs off French Polynesia.
