= Latirus strangei =

Scientific classification
- Kingdom: Animalia
- Phylum: Mollusca
- Class: Gastropoda
- Subclass: Caenogastropoda
- Order: Neogastropoda
- Family: Fasciolariidae
- Genus: Latirus
- Species: L. strangei

Binomial name
- Latirus strangei (Adams, 1855)

Synonyms
- Peristernia strangei (Adams, 1855)

Species of sea snail

Latirus strangei is a species of sea snail, a marine gastropod mollusc in the family Fasciolariidae, the spindle snails, the tulip snails and their allies.
