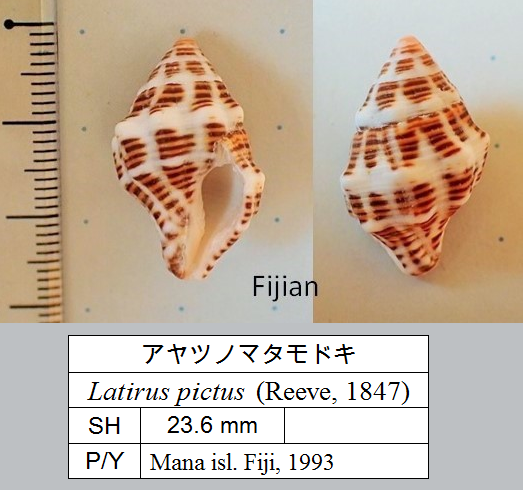

Scientific classification
- Kingdom: Animalia
- Phylum: Mollusca
- Class: Gastropoda
- Subclass: Caenogastropoda
- Order: Neogastropoda
- Family: Fasciolariidae
- Genus: Latirus
- Species: L. pictus

Binomial name
- Latirus pictus (Reeve, 1847)

Synonyms
- Turbinella picta Reeve, 1847

= Latirus pictus =

Species of gastropod

Latirus pictus is a species of sea snail, a marine gastropod mollusc in the family Fasciolariidae, the spindle snails, the tulip snails and their allies.
