= Latirus philippinensis =

Scientific classification
- Kingdom: Animalia
- Phylum: Mollusca
- Class: Gastropoda
- Subclass: Caenogastropoda
- Order: Neogastropoda
- Family: Fasciolariidae
- Genus: Latirus
- Species: L. philippinensis

Binomial name
- Latirus philippinensis Snyder, 2003

Species of gastropod

Latirus philippinensis is a species of sea snail, a marine gastropod mollusc in the family Fasciolariidae, the spindle snails, the tulip snails and their allies.

== Distribution ==
Taken in tangle nets, at about 80 metres depth -Philippines
