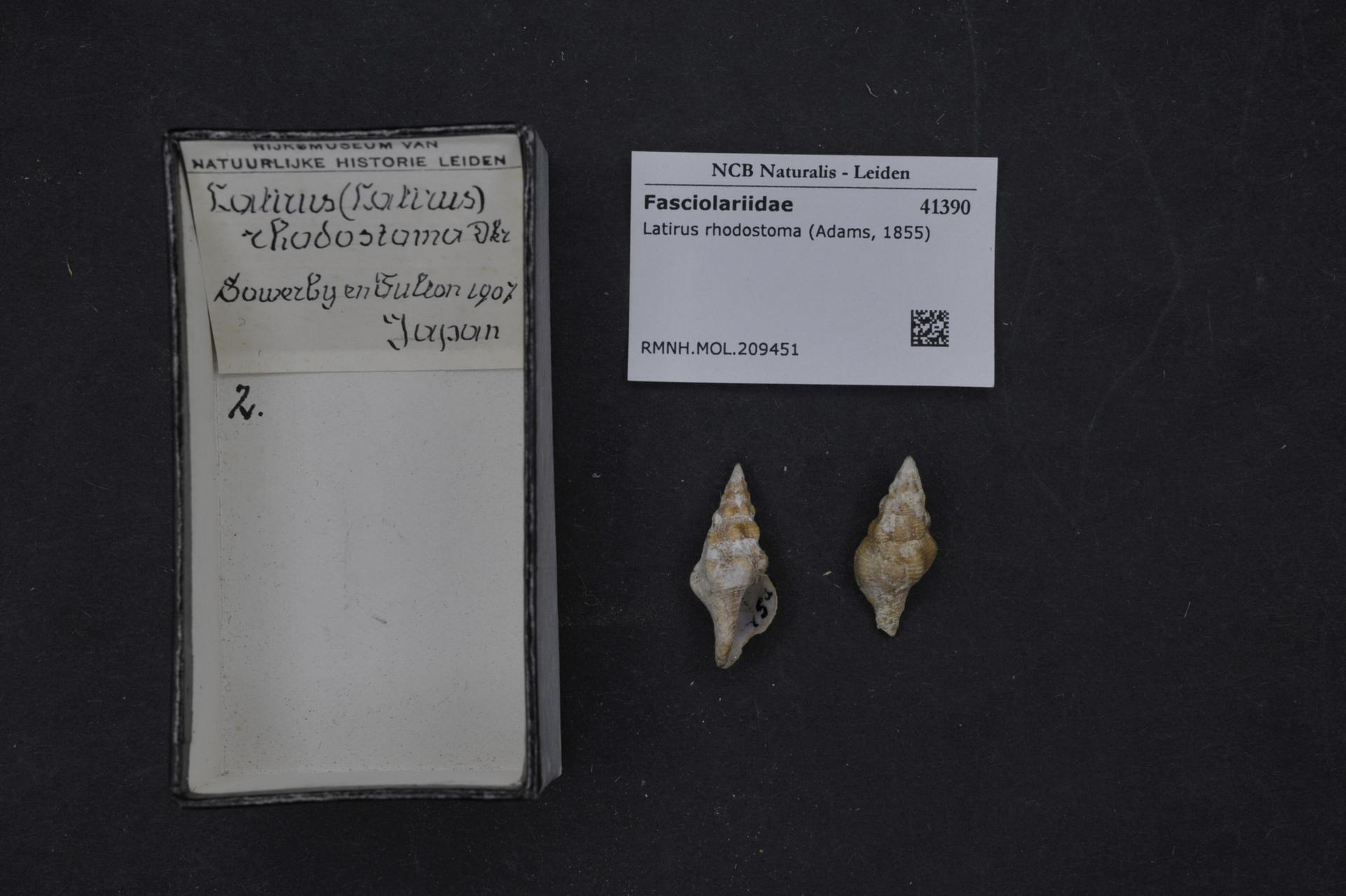

Scientific classification
- Kingdom: Animalia
- Phylum: Mollusca
- Class: Gastropoda
- Subclass: Caenogastropoda
- Order: Neogastropoda
- Family: Fasciolariidae
- Genus: Latirus
- Species: L. rhodostoma

Binomial name
- Latirus rhodostoma (Adams, 1855)

Synonyms
- Rapana rhodostoma Adams, 1855

= Latirus rhodostoma =

Species of gastropod

Latirus rhodostoma is a species of sea snail, a marine gastropod mollusc in the family Fasciolariidae, the spindle snails, the tulip snails and their allies.
