= Latirus stenomphalus =

Scientific classification
- Kingdom: Animalia
- Phylum: Mollusca
- Class: Gastropoda
- Subclass: Caenogastropoda
- Order: Neogastropoda
- Family: Fasciolariidae
- Genus: Latirus
- Species: L. stenomphalus

Binomial name
- Latirus stenomphalus Habe & Kosuge, 1966

Species of gastropod

Latirus stenomphalus is a species of sea snail, a marine gastropod mollusc in the family Fasciolariidae, the spindle snails, the tulip snails and their allies.
