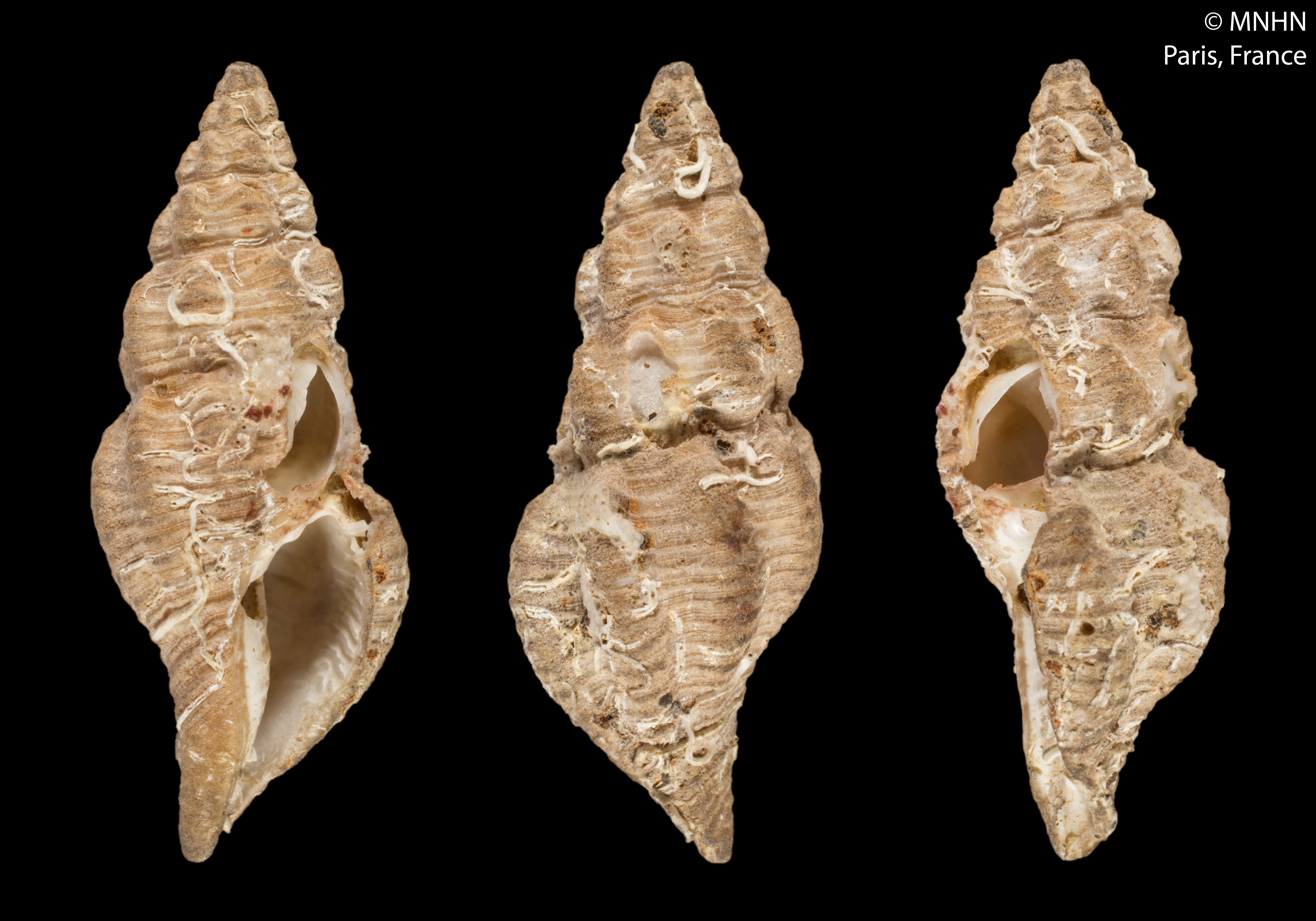
- Shell of Latirus rugosissimus (syntype at MNHN, Paris)

Scientific classification
- Kingdom: Animalia
- Phylum: Mollusca
- Class: Gastropoda
- Subclass: Caenogastropoda
- Order: Neogastropoda
- Family: Fasciolariidae
- Genus: Latirus
- Species: L. rugosissimus

Binomial name
- Latirus rugosissimus (Locard, 1897)

Synonyms
- Clathurella rugosissima Locard, 1897

= Latirus rugosissimus =

Species of gastropod

Latirus rugosissimus is a species of sea snail, a marine gastropod mollusc in the family Fasciolariidae, the spindle snails and the tulip snails.

== Description ==
The length of the shell attains 27.2 mm.

== Distribution ==
This marine species occurs off Madeira.
