= Latirus fallax =

Scientific classification
- Kingdom: Animalia
- Phylum: Mollusca
- Class: Gastropoda
- Subclass: Caenogastropoda
- Order: Neogastropoda
- Family: Fasciolariidae
- Genus: Latirus
- Species: L. fallax

Binomial name
- Latirus fallax (Küster & Kobelt, 1874)

Synonyms
- Turbinella fallax Küster & Kobelt, 1874; Plicatella fallax (Küster & Kobelt, 1874)

Species of gastropod

Latirus fallax is a species of sea snail, a marine gastropod mollusc in the family Fasciolariidae, the spindle snails, the tulip snails and their allies.
