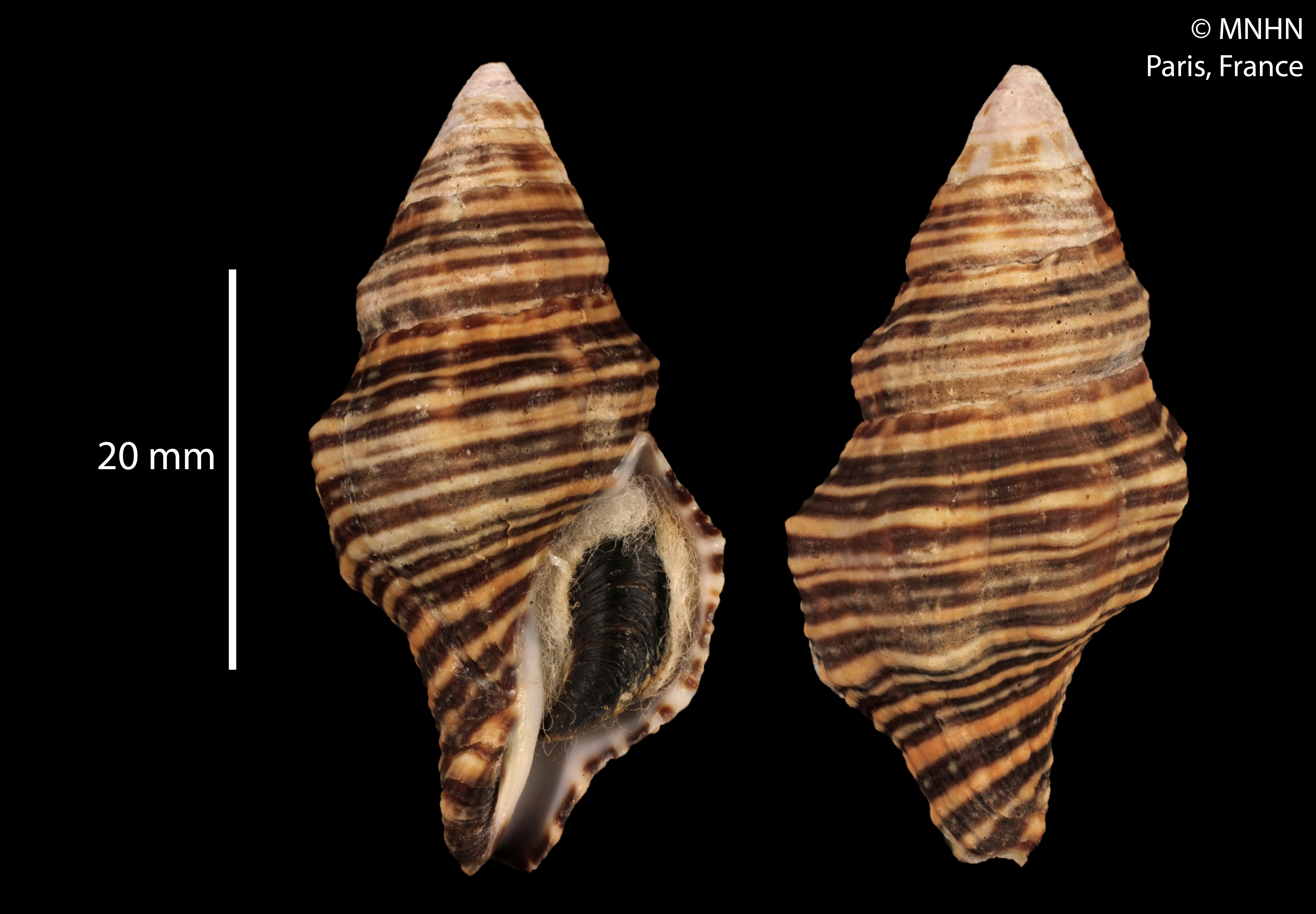

Scientific classification
- Kingdom: Animalia
- Phylum: Mollusca
- Class: Gastropoda
- Subclass: Caenogastropoda
- Order: Neogastropoda
- Family: Fasciolariidae
- Genus: Latirus
- Species: L. ornatus

Binomial name
- Latirus ornatus Lyons, W.G. & M.A. Snyder, 2015

= Latirus ornatus =

Species of gastropod

Latirus ornatus is a species of sea snail, a marine gastropod mollusc in the family Fasciolariidae, the spindle snails, the tulip snails and their allies.

== Description ==
The size of the shell varies between 20 mm (0.8 in) and 55 mm (2.2 in).
