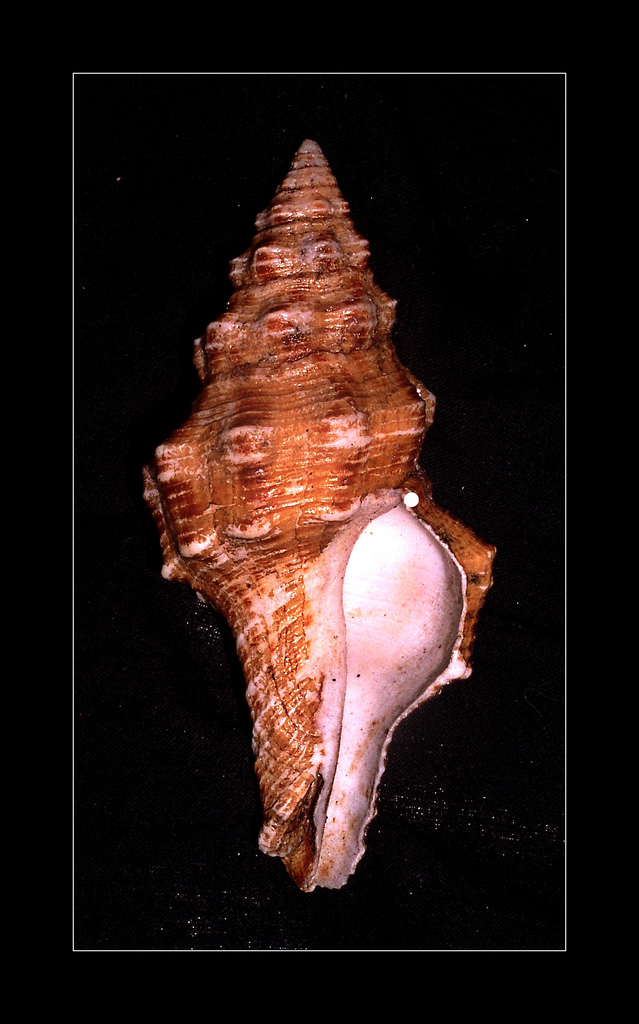

Scientific classification
- Kingdom: Animalia
- Phylum: Mollusca
- Class: Gastropoda
- Subclass: Caenogastropoda
- Order: Neogastropoda
- Family: Fasciolariidae
- Genus: Latirus
- Species: L. polygonus

Binomial name
- Latirus polygonus (Gmelin, 1791)

Synonyms
- Murex polygonus Gmelin, 1791; Fusus polyedros Röding, P.F., 1798; Cymatium annulatum Link, H.F., 1807; Murex lignarius Perry, G., 1811; Latirus polygonus tessellata (f) Küster, H.C. & W. Kobelt, 1874

= Latirus polygonus =

Species of gastropod

Latirus polygonus, the short-tailed latirus, is a species of sea snail, a marine gastropod mollusc in the family Fasciolariidae, the spindle snails, the tulip snails and their allies.

== Description ==
The shell size varies between 25 mm and 105 mm. The shell is moderate, heavy, thick, and fusiform. The species has a tall spire with sharp, pointed apex. Features 5 to 6 rounded whorls with strong tubercles, and irregular spiral cords with impressed suture. The body whorl is large, flat, while the shoulder has 2 spiral rows of nodules. The aperture is long with denticles in the inner edge of the thin outer lip. columella includes callus, with 4 small folds in the anterior. The color in the exterior is cream to yellowish with interrupted dark brown spiral bands. The aperture, lips and columella are white. An average shell length is 67mm. Average shell width being 40mm. Average aperture length is 42 mm while the average aperture width is 12mm.

== Distribution ==
This species is distributed in the Red Sea and in the Indian Ocean along Tanzania, Aldabra, Chagos, Madagascar, the Mascarene Basin, St. Martin's island and in the Western Pacific Ocean.
