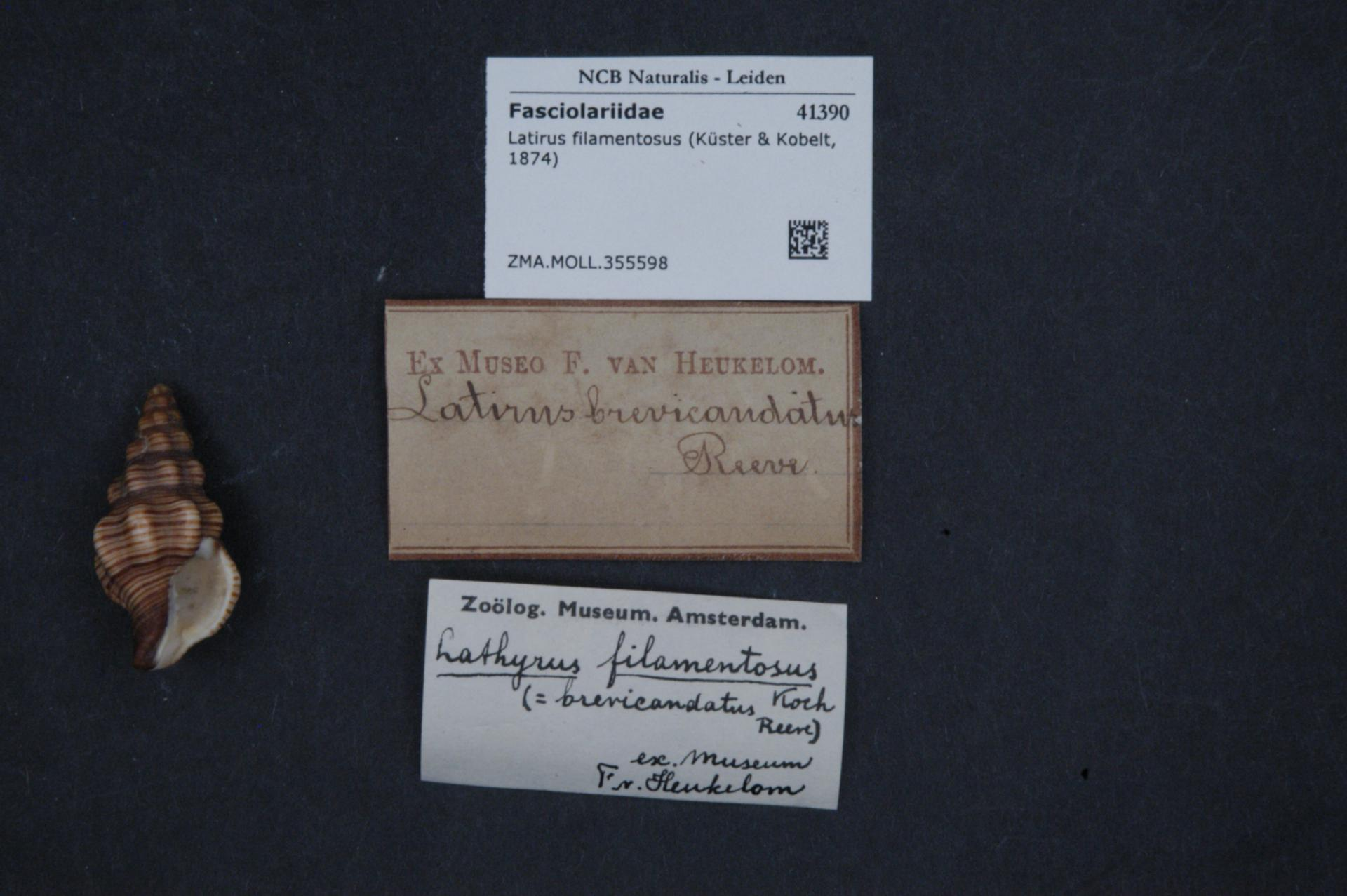

Scientific classification
- Kingdom: Animalia
- Phylum: Mollusca
- Class: Gastropoda
- Subclass: Caenogastropoda
- Order: Neogastropoda
- Family: Fasciolariidae
- Genus: Latirus
- Species: L. filamentosus

Binomial name
- Latirus filamentosus (Küster & Kobelt, 1874)

Synonyms
- Turbinella filamentosus Küster & Kobelt, 1874

= Latirus filamentosus =

Species of gastropod

Latirus filamentosus is a species of sea snail, a marine gastropod mollusc in the family Fasciolariidae, the spindle snails, the tulip snails and their allies.
