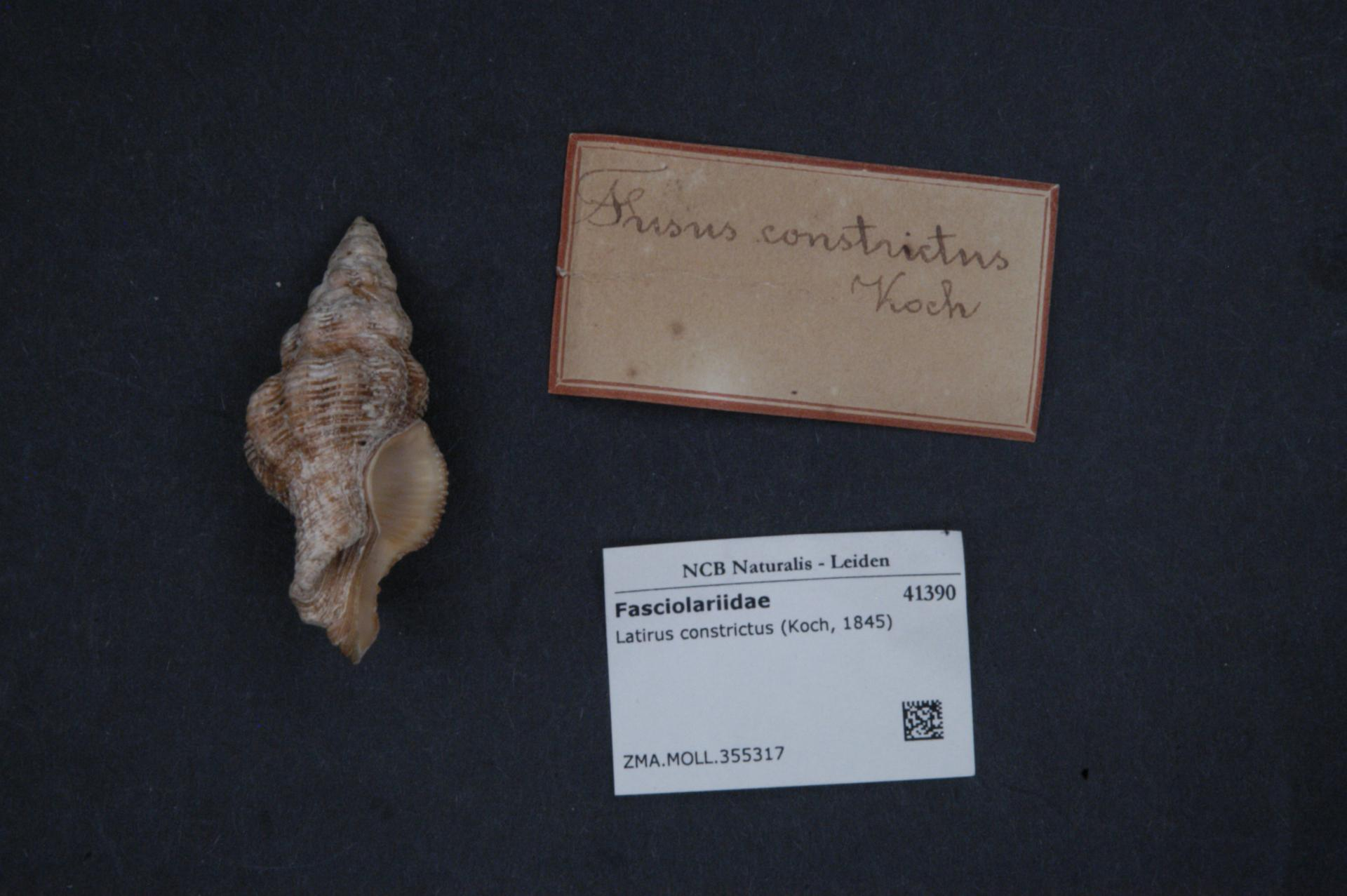

Scientific classification
- Kingdom: Animalia
- Phylum: Mollusca
- Class: Gastropoda
- Subclass: Caenogastropoda
- Order: Neogastropoda
- Family: Fasciolariidae
- Genus: Latirus
- Species: L. constrictus

Binomial name
- Latirus constrictus (Koch, 1845)

Synonyms
- Fusus constrictus Koch, 1845

= Latirus constrictus =

Species of gastropod

Latirus constrictus is a species of sea snail, a marine gastropod mollusk in the family Fasciolariidae, the spindle snails, the tulip snails and their allies.
