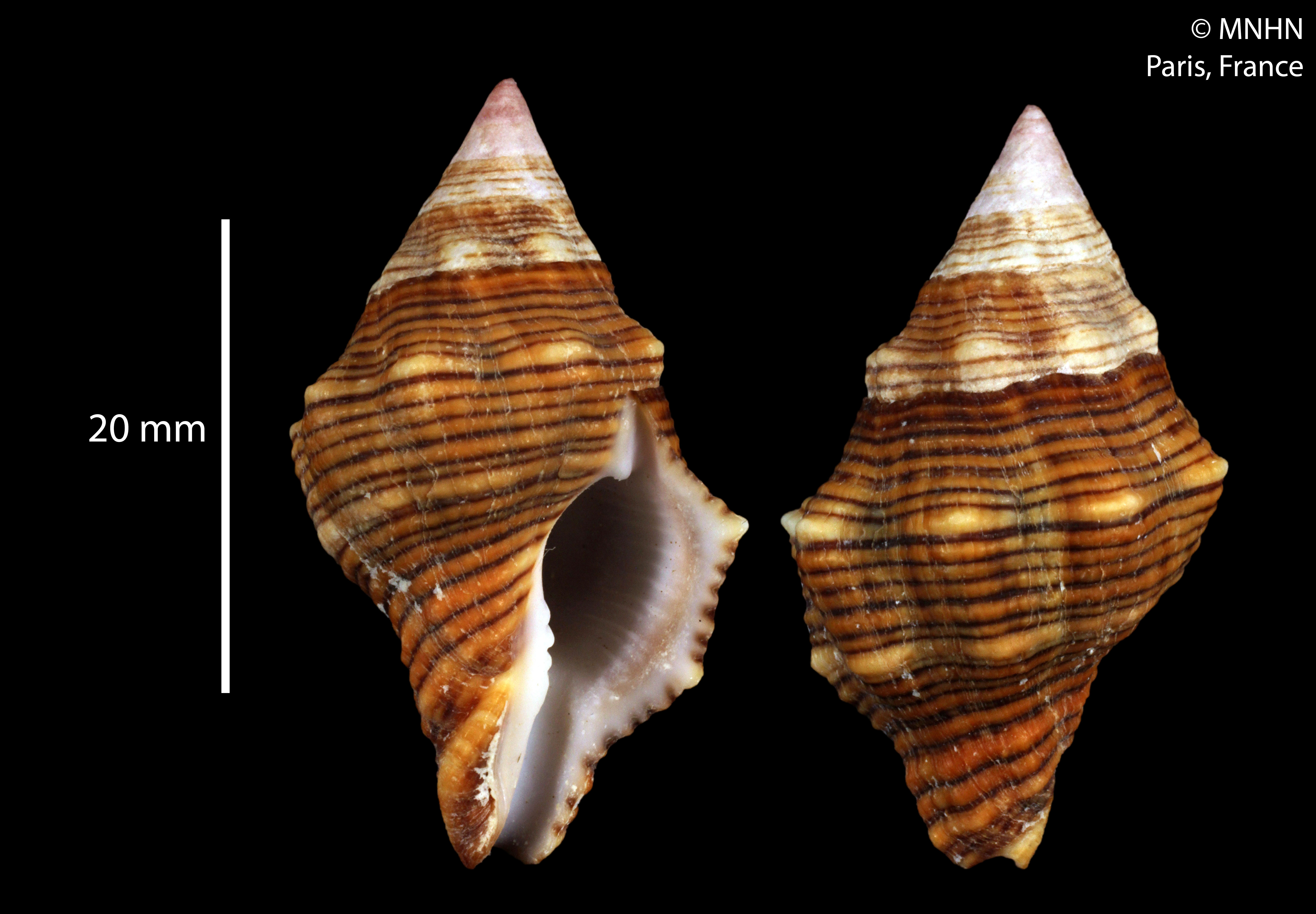

Scientific classification
- Kingdom: Animalia
- Phylum: Mollusca
- Class: Gastropoda
- Subclass: Caenogastropoda
- Order: Neogastropoda
- Family: Fasciolariidae
- Genus: Latirus
- Species: L. poppei

Binomial name
- Latirus poppei Lyons, W. G. & Snyder, M. A. (2015)

= Latirus poppei =

Species of gastropod

Latirus poppei is a species of sea snail, a marine gastropod mollusc in the family Fasciolariidae, the spindle snails, the tulip snails and their allies.

== Description ==
The size of the shell varies between 25 mm (1.0 in) and 50 mm (2.0 in).

== Distribution ==
This marine species occurs off the Philippines, Thailand, and the Solomon Islands.
