= Latirus tenuistratus =

Scientific classification
- Kingdom: Animalia
- Phylum: Mollusca
- Class: Gastropoda
- Subclass: Caenogastropoda
- Order: Neogastropoda
- Family: Fasciolariidae
- Genus: Latirus
- Species: L. tenuistratus

Binomial name
- Latirus tenuistratus (G. B. Sowerby II, 1880)

Species of gastropod

Latirus tenuistratus is a species of sea snail, a marine gastropod mollusc in the family Fasciolariidae, the spindle snails, the tulip snails and their allies.
