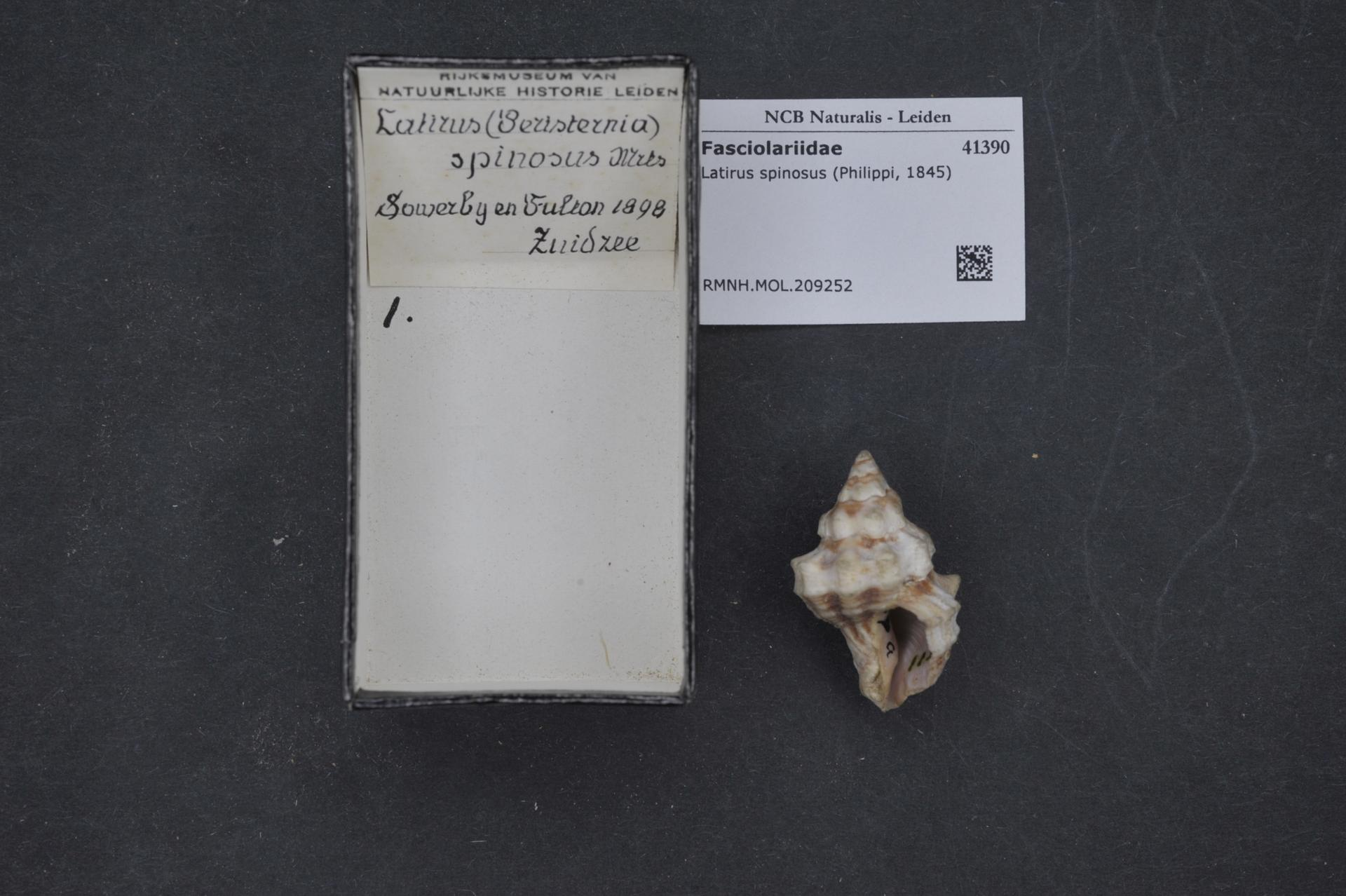

Scientific classification
- Kingdom: Animalia
- Phylum: Mollusca
- Class: Gastropoda
- Subclass: Caenogastropoda
- Order: Neogastropoda
- Family: Fasciolariidae
- Genus: Latirus
- Species: L. spinosus

Binomial name
- Latirus spinosus (Philippi, 1845)

Synonyms
- Turbinella spinosa Philippi, 1845

= Latirus spinosus =

Species of gastropod

Latirus spinosus is a species of sea snail, a marine gastropod mollusc in the family Fasciolariidae, the spindle snails, the tulip snails and their allies.
