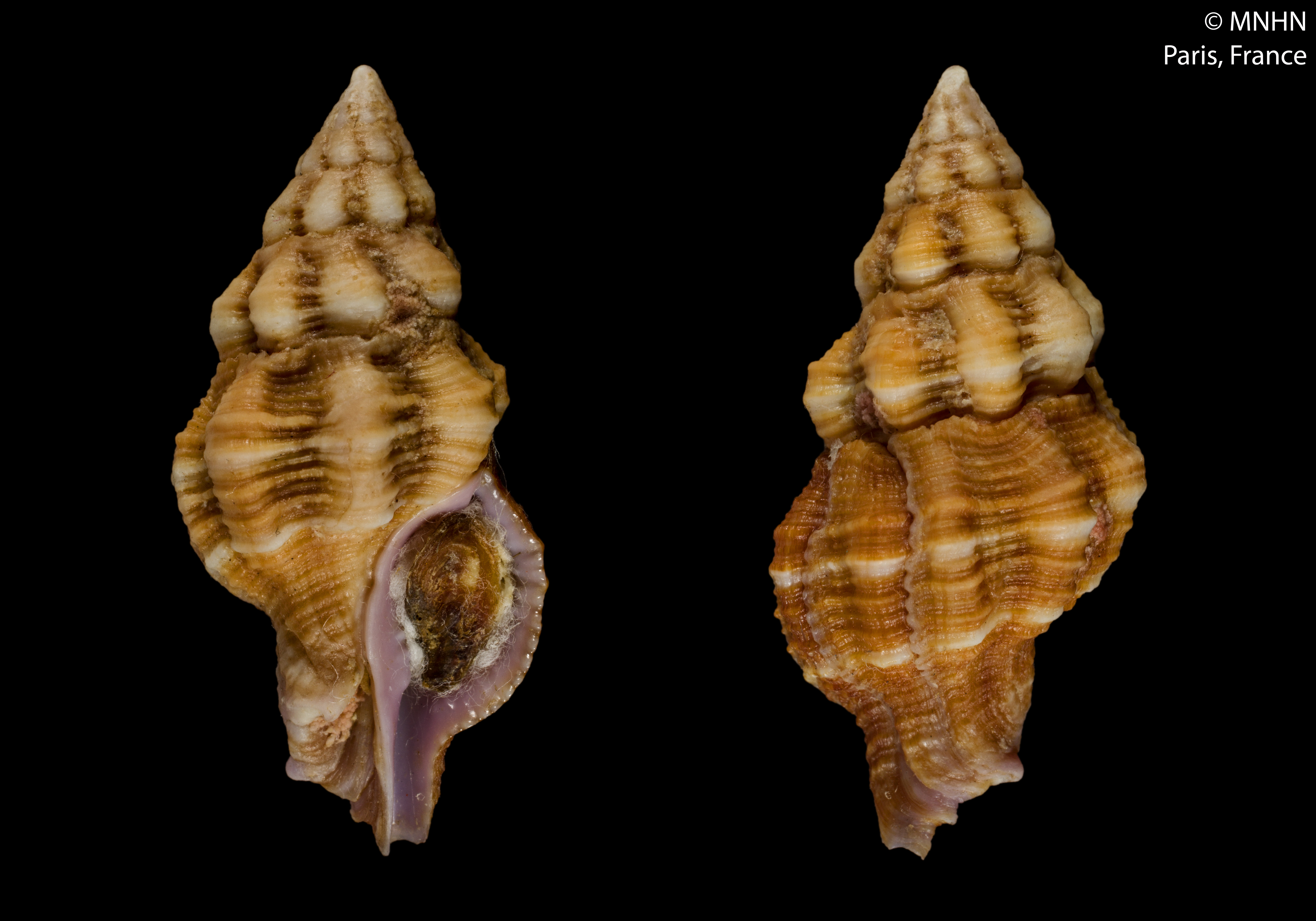

Scientific classification
- Kingdom: Animalia
- Phylum: Mollusca
- Class: Gastropoda
- Subclass: Caenogastropoda
- Order: Neogastropoda
- Family: Fasciolariidae
- Genus: Latirus
- Species: L. anosyanus

Binomial name
- Latirus anosyanus Bozzetti, 2018

= Latirus anosyanus =

Species of gastropod

Latirus anosyanus is a species of sea snail, a marine gastropod mollusc in the family Fasciolariidae, the spindle snails, the tulip snails and their allies.

== Distribution ==
The distribution of this species is native to Madagascar. The type locality of this species was located in Madagascar.
