= Latirus rufus =

Scientific classification
- Kingdom: Animalia
- Phylum: Mollusca
- Class: Gastropoda
- Subclass: Caenogastropoda
- Order: Neogastropoda
- Family: Fasciolariidae
- Genus: Latirus
- Species: L. rufus

Binomial name
- Latirus rufus (Reeve, 1848)

Synonyms
- Fusus rufus Reeve, 1848

Species of gastropod

Latirus rufus is a species of sea snail, a marine gastropod mollusc in the family Fasciolariidae, the spindle snails, the tulip snails and their allies.
