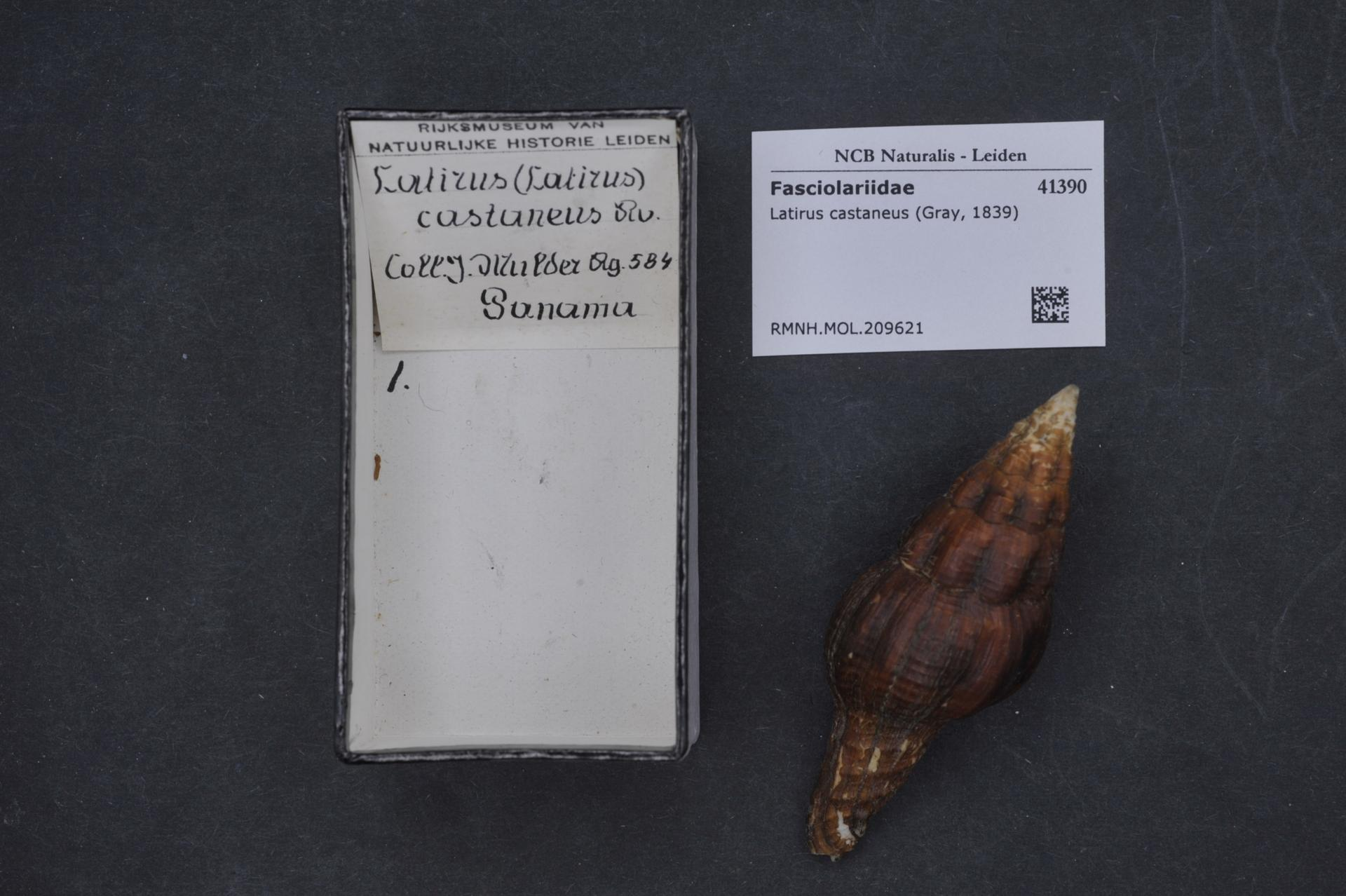
- Latirus castaneus (Gary, c1839)

Scientific classification
- Kingdom: Animalia
- Phylum: Mollusca
- Class: Gastropoda
- Subclass: Caenogastropoda
- Order: Neogastropoda
- Family: Fasciolariidae
- Genus: Latirus
- Species: L. castaneus

Binomial name
- Latirus castaneus (Gray, 1839)

Synonyms
- Turbinella castanea Gray, 1839

= Latirus castaneus =

Species of gastropod

Latirus castaneus is a species of sea snail, a marine gastropod mollusc in the family Fasciolariidae, the spindle snails, the tulip snails and their allies.
