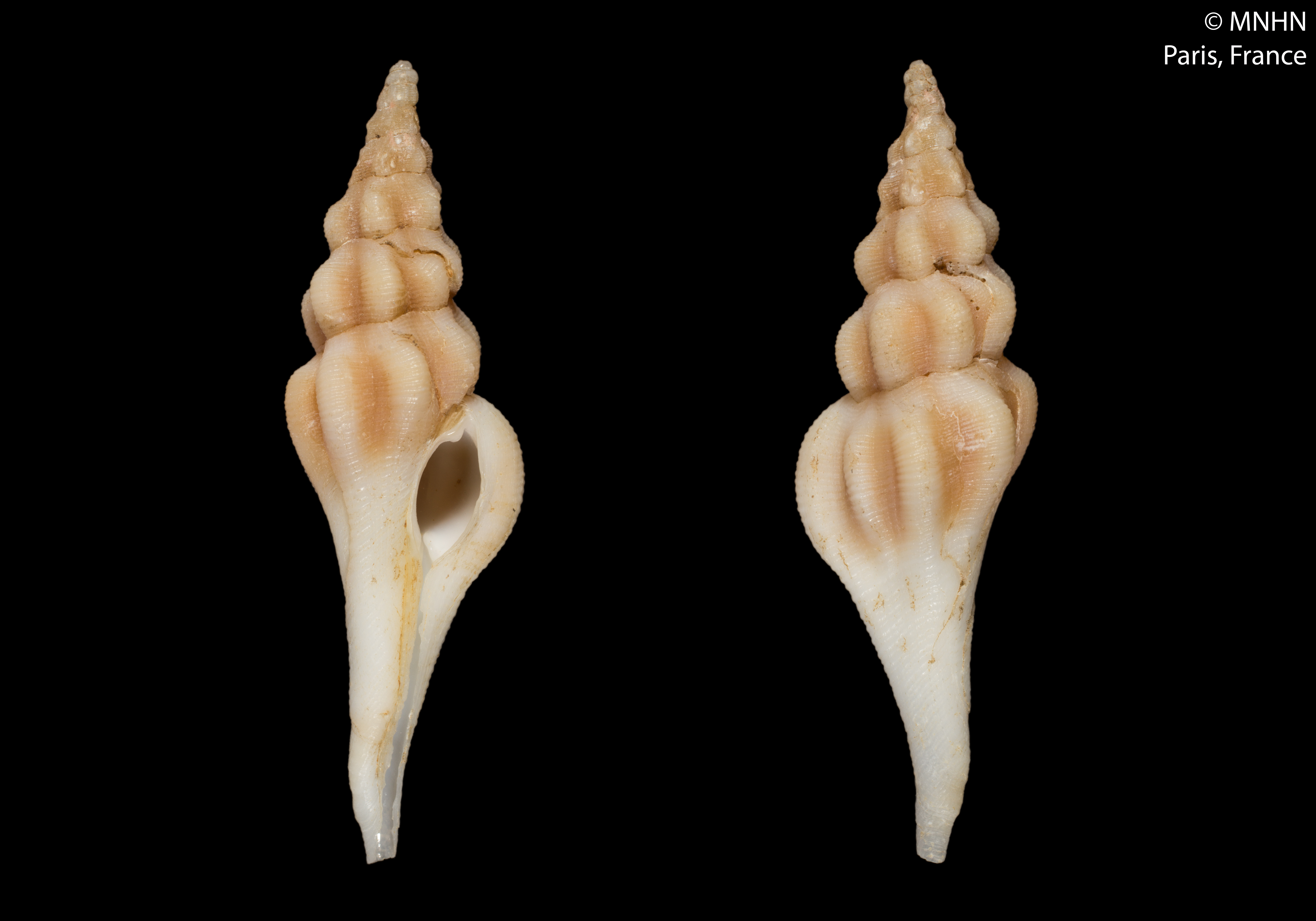
- Shell of Crassibougia hediae (holotype at MNHN, Paris)

Scientific classification
- Kingdom: Animalia
- Phylum: Mollusca
- Class: Gastropoda
- Subclass: Caenogastropoda
- Order: Neogastropoda
- Superfamily: Buccinoidea
- Family: Fasciolariidae
- Genus: Crassibougia; Stahlschmidt & Fraussen, 2012

Type species
- Fusus clausicaudatus Hinds, 1844

= Crassibougia =

Genus of gastropods

Crassibougia is a genus of sea snails, marine gastropod mollusks in the family Fasciolariidae, the spindle snails, the tulip snails and their allies.

== Species ==
Species within the genus Crassibougia include:

- Crassibougia clausicaudata (Hinds, 1844)
- Crassibougia hediae Stahlschmidt & Fraussen, 2012
