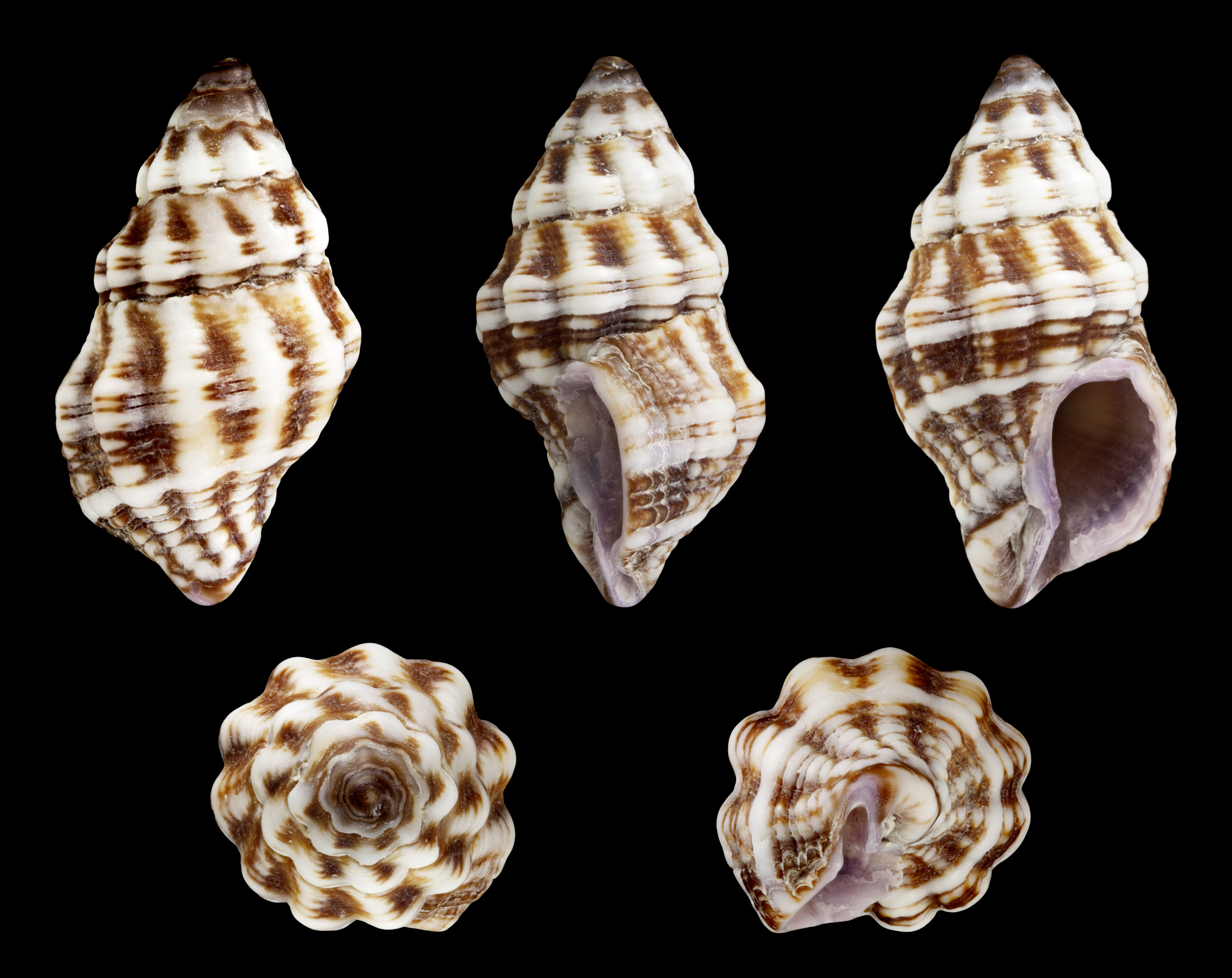
- Shell of Latirus philberti

Scientific classification
- Kingdom: Animalia
- Phylum: Mollusca
- Class: Gastropoda
- Subclass: Caenogastropoda
- Order: Neogastropoda
- Superfamily: Buccinoidea
- Family: Fasciolariidae
- Genus: Latirus
- Species: L. philberti

Binomial name
- Latirus philberti (Récluz, 1844)

Synonyms
- Latirus candelabrum (Reeve, 1847); Peristernia philberti (Récluz, 1844); Turbinella candelabrum Reeve, 1847; Turbinella philberti Récluz, 1844 (original combination)

= Latirus philberti =

Species of gastropod

Latirus philberti, common name Philbert's Peristernia, is a species of sea snail, a marine gastropod mollusc in the family Fasciolariidae, the spindle snails, the tulip snails and their allies.

== Description ==
The length of the shell attains 24 mm.

== Distribution ==
This marine species occurs off the Philippines.
