= Latirus williamlyonsi =

Scientific classification
- Kingdom: Animalia
- Phylum: Mollusca
- Class: Gastropoda
- Subclass: Caenogastropoda
- Order: Neogastropoda
- Family: Fasciolariidae
- Genus: Latirus
- Species: L. williamlyonsi

Binomial name
- Latirus williamlyonsi Petuch & Sargent, 2011

Synonyms
- Latirus (Polygona) williamlyonsi (Petuch & Sargent, 2011)

Species of gastropod

Latirus williamlyonsi is a species of sea snail, a marine gastropod mollusc in the family Fasciolariidae, the spindle snails, the tulip snails and their allies.

== Distribution and Habit ==
There has been one instance of this marine species on the eastern coast of Florida, United States.

Latirus williamlyonsi is endemic to the western Atlantic Ocean, with its primary range confined to the Florida Keys and southeastern Florida coastal areas.

Collection records indicate occurrences in shallow coastal areas off Florida, including sites from Biscayne Bay to Key West and off Fort Pierce, based on specimens documented in the original description. The holotype (USNM 1152531) was dredged from 50 meters depth off Fort Pierce, Florida. The species is considered rare and highly localized, with no confirmed reports beyond these Florida localities.

Historical distribution aligns with current knowledge, derived from the 2011 description by Petuch and Sargent.
