= Latirus filmerae =

Scientific classification
- Kingdom: Animalia
- Phylum: Mollusca
- Class: Gastropoda
- Subclass: Caenogastropoda
- Order: Neogastropoda
- Family: Fasciolariidae
- Genus: Latirus
- Species: L. filmerae

Binomial name
- Latirus filmerae (G.B. Sowerby III, 1900)

Synonyms
- Euthria filmerae G.B. Sowerby III, 1900

Species of gastropod

Latirus filmerae is a species of sea snail, a marine gastropod mollusc in the family Fasciolariidae, the spindle snails, the tulip snails and their allies.
