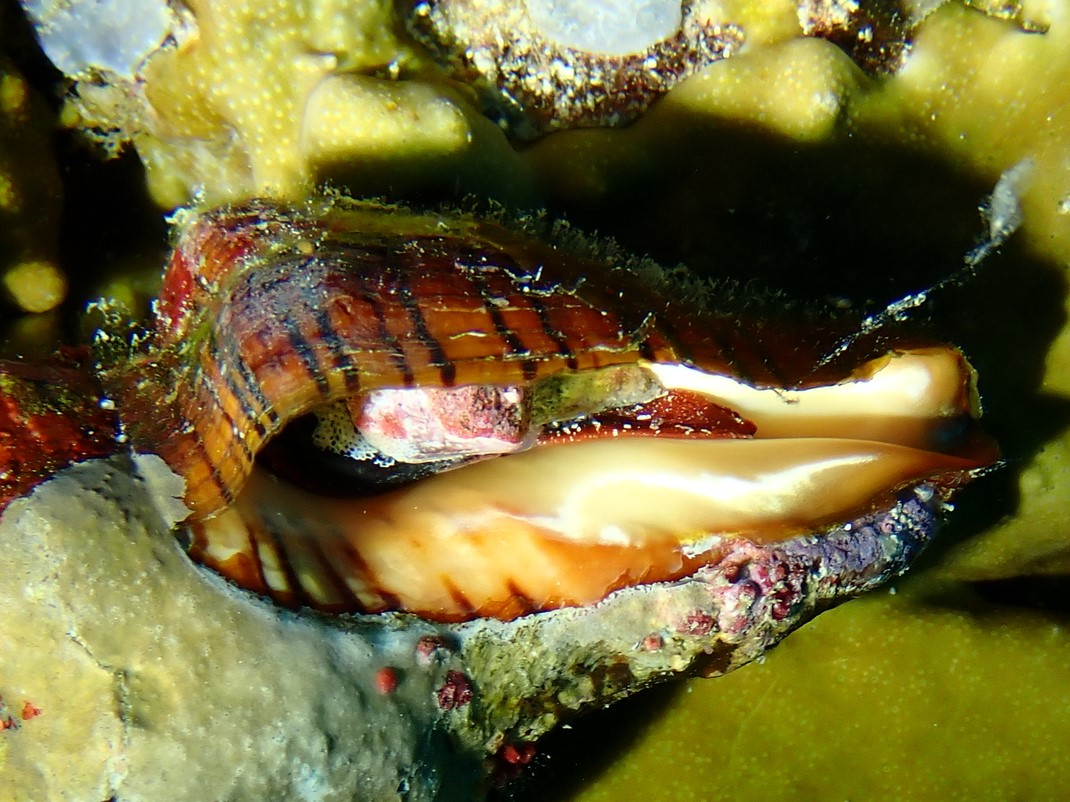

Scientific classification
- Kingdom: Animalia
- Phylum: Mollusca
- Class: Gastropoda
- Subclass: Caenogastropoda
- Order: Neogastropoda
- Family: Fasciolariidae
- Genus: Latirus
- Species: L. gibbulus

Binomial name
- Latirus gibbulus (Gmelin, 1791)

Synonyms
- Fusus filosus Lamarck, 1816; Fusus gibbulus (Gmelin, 1791); Fusus tapetepersicum Röding, 1798; Latirus aurantiacus Montfort, 1810; Murex gibbulus Gmelin, 1791 (original combination); Neptunea ecaudata Link, 1807

= Latirus gibbulus =

Species of gastropod

Latirus gibbulus, commonly known as gibbose latirus, is a species of sea snail, a marine gastropod mollusc in the family Fasciolariidae, the spindle snails, the tulip snails and their allies.

== Description ==
The size of the shell varies between 50 mm and 115 mm.

== Distribution ==
This marine species occurs in the Indo-West Pacific.
