= Polygona bernadensis =

Scientific classification
- Kingdom: Animalia
- Phylum: Mollusca
- Class: Gastropoda
- Subclass: Caenogastropoda
- Order: Neogastropoda
- Family: Fasciolariidae
- Genus: Polygona
- Species: P. bernadensis

Binomial name
- Polygona bernadensis (Bullock, 1947)

Synonyms
- Latirus (Polygona) bernadensis Bullock, 1974 (basionym); Latirus bernadensis Bullock, 1947 (original combination)

Species of gastropod

Polygona bernadensis is a species of sea snail, a marine gastropod mollusk in the family Fasciolariidae, the spindle snails, the tulip snails and their allies.

== Distribution ==
This marine species occurs off Barbados.
