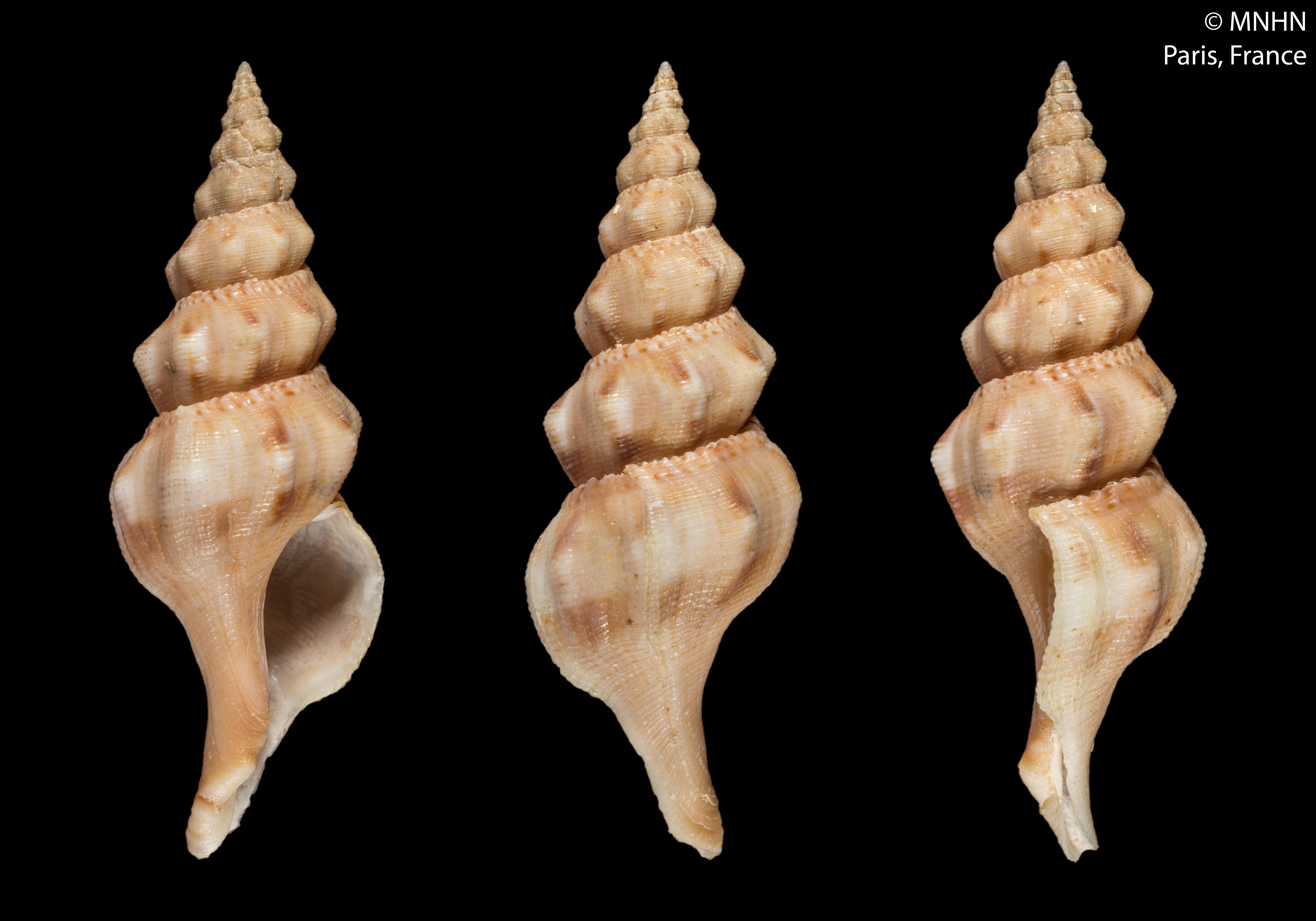
- Shell of Fusolatirus suduirauti

Scientific classification
- Kingdom: Animalia
- Phylum: Mollusca
- Class: Gastropoda
- Subclass: Caenogastropoda
- Order: Neogastropoda
- Family: Fasciolariidae
- Genus: Fusolatirus
- Species: F. suduirauti

Binomial name
- Fusolatirus suduirauti Fraussen, 2003

Synonyms
- Euthria suduirauti Fraussen, 2003; Latirus cloveri Snyder, 2003; Latirus suduirauti (Fraussen, 2003)

= Fusolatirus suduirauti =

Species of gastropod

Fusolatirus suduirauti is a species of sea snail, a marine gastropod mollusc in the family Fasciolariidae, the spindle snails, the tulip snails and their allies.

== Description ==
The shell size varies between 25 mm and 50 mm.

== Distribution ==
This species is distributed in the seas off the Philippines.
