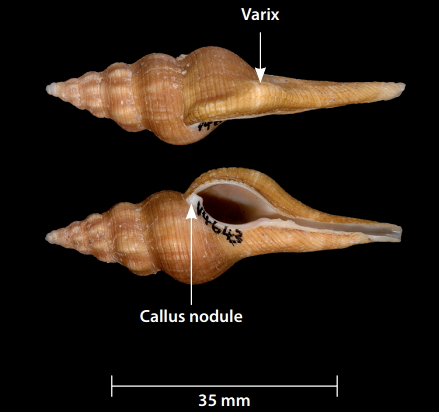
- Shell of Crassibougia clausicaudata

Scientific classification
- Kingdom: Animalia
- Phylum: Mollusca
- Class: Gastropoda
- Subclass: Caenogastropoda
- Order: Neogastropoda
- Family: Fasciolariidae
- Genus: Crassibougia
- Species: C. clausicaudata

Binomial name
- Crassibougia clausicaudata (Hinds, 1844)

Synonyms
- Fusus clausicaudatus Hinds, 1844 (original combination); Latirus clausicaudatus (Hinds, 1844); Pseudolatirus clausicaudatus (Hinds, 1844) ·

= Crassibougia clausicaudata =

Species of gastropod

Crassibougia clausicaudata is a species of sea snail, a marine gastropod mollusk in the family Fasciolariidae, the spindle snails, the tulip snails and their allies.

== Description ==
The length of the shell reaches 60 mm.

The shell is moderately small and narrowly spindle-shaped, becoming robust in adulthood. The spire whorls are adorned with strong, widely spaced, rounded axial ribs, which become less pronounced or nearly absent on the final adult whorl. The spiral sculpture consists of low, flat-topped cords separated by narrow, variably incised grooves. The siphonal canal is elongated with a narrow, slit-like opening. In mature specimens, the aperture features a pronounced callus nodule just below the outer lip's insertion, along with a well-developed varix behind the outer lip.

The shell is orange-brown when fresh, with axial ribs typically appearing slightly paler. The aperture is whitish, while the animal itself is orange-red.

== Distribution ==
This marine species is endemic to South Africa and occurs off the Agulhas Bank (Still Bay to Port Alfred) at depths between 50 m and 150 m.
