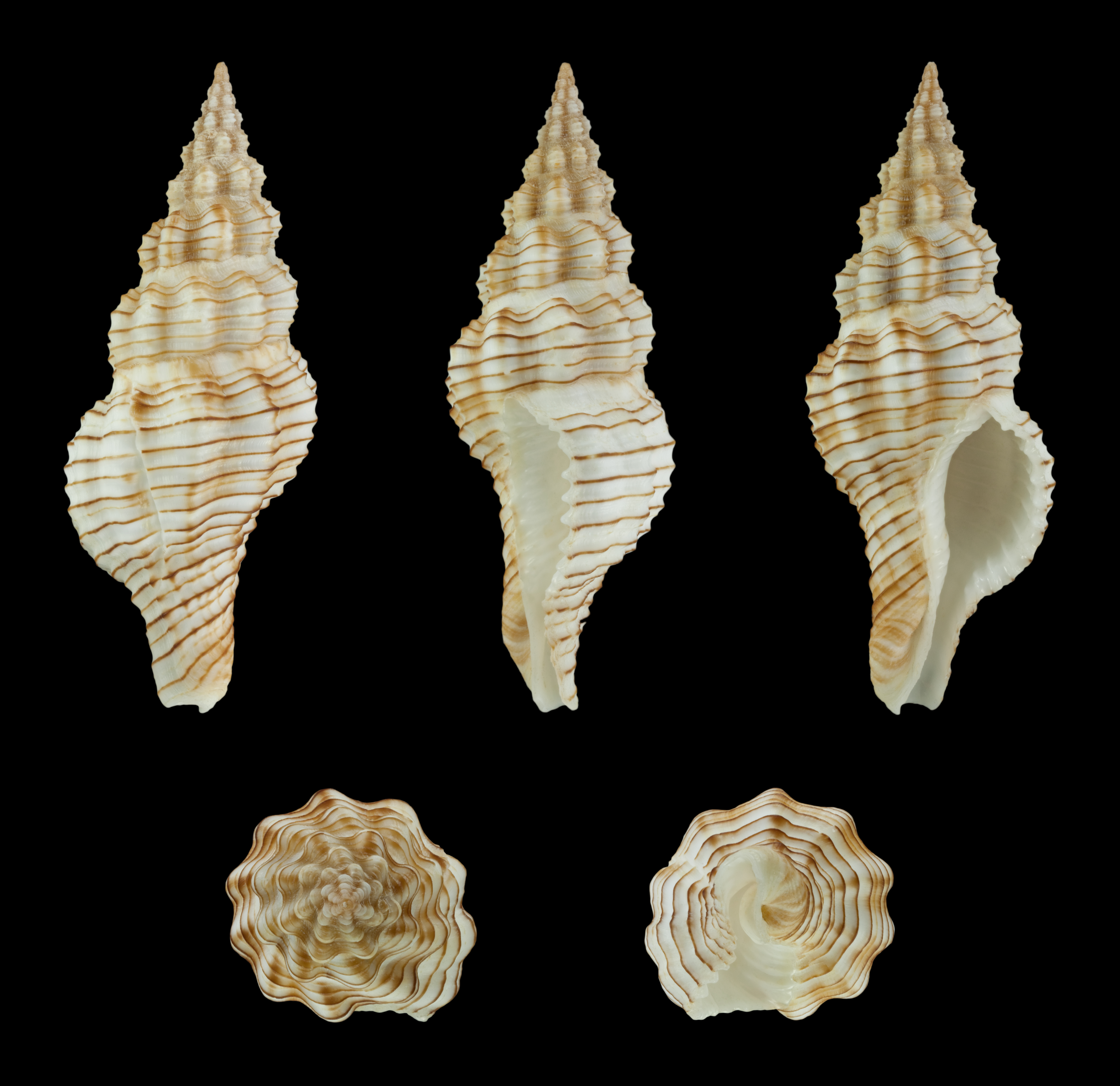
- Polygona filosa shell

Scientific classification
- Kingdom: Animalia
- Phylum: Mollusca
- Class: Gastropoda
- Subclass: Caenogastropoda
- Order: Neogastropoda
- Family: Fasciolariidae
- Genus: Polygona
- Species: P. filosa

Binomial name
- Polygona filosa (Schubert & Wagner, 1829)

Synonyms
- Buccinum filosa A. Adams & Reeve, 1850; Fusinus filosus (Schubert & J. A. Wagner, 1829); Fusus elegans Gray, 1838; Fusus filosa (A. Adams & Reeve, 1850); Latirus filosus (Schubert & Wagner, 1829); Turbinella filosa (Schubert & Wagner, 1829

= Polygona filosa =

Species of gastropod

Polygona filosa is a species of sea snail, a marine gastropod mollusk in the family Fasciolariidae, the spindle snails, the tulip snails and their allies.
