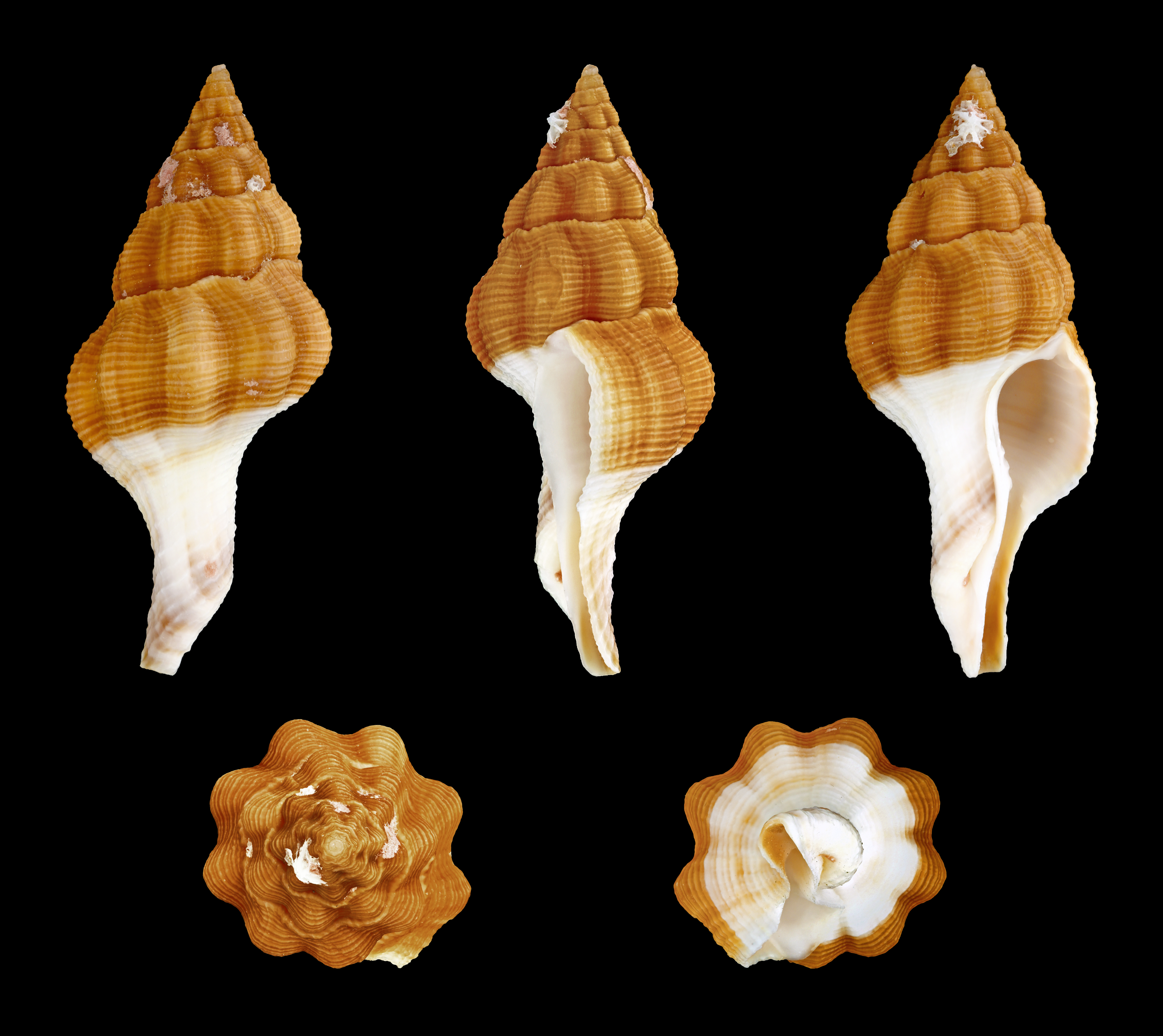
- Shell of Fusolatirus paetelianus

Scientific classification
- Kingdom: Animalia
- Phylum: Mollusca
- Class: Gastropoda
- Subclass: Caenogastropoda
- Order: Neogastropoda
- Family: Fasciolariidae
- Genus: Fusolatirus
- Species: F. paetelianus

Binomial name
- Fusolatirus paetelianus (Küster & Kobelt, 1874)

Synonyms
- Latirus carpentariensis Hedley, 1912 (junior synonym); Latirus paetelianus (Küster & Kobelt, 1874); Latirus paetelianus var. carpentariensis Hedley, 1912; Turbinella paeteliana Küster & Kobelt, 1874

= Fusolatirus paetelianus =

Species of gastropod

Fusolatirus paetelianus is a species of sea snail, a marine gastropod mollusc in the family Fasciolariidae, the spindle snails, the tulip snails and their allies.
