= Fusinus labronicus =

Scientific classification
- Kingdom: Animalia
- Phylum: Mollusca
- Class: Gastropoda
- Subclass: Caenogastropoda
- Order: Neogastropoda
- Family: Fasciolariidae
- Genus: Fusinus
- Species: F. labronicus

Binomial name
- Fusinus labronicus (Monterosato, 1884)

Synonyms
- Latirus labronicus (Monterosato, 1884); Pseudofusus labronicus Monterosato, 1884

Species of gastropod

Fusinus labronicus is a species of sea snail, a marine gastropod mollusc in the family Fasciolariidae, the spindle snails, the tulip snails and their allies.
