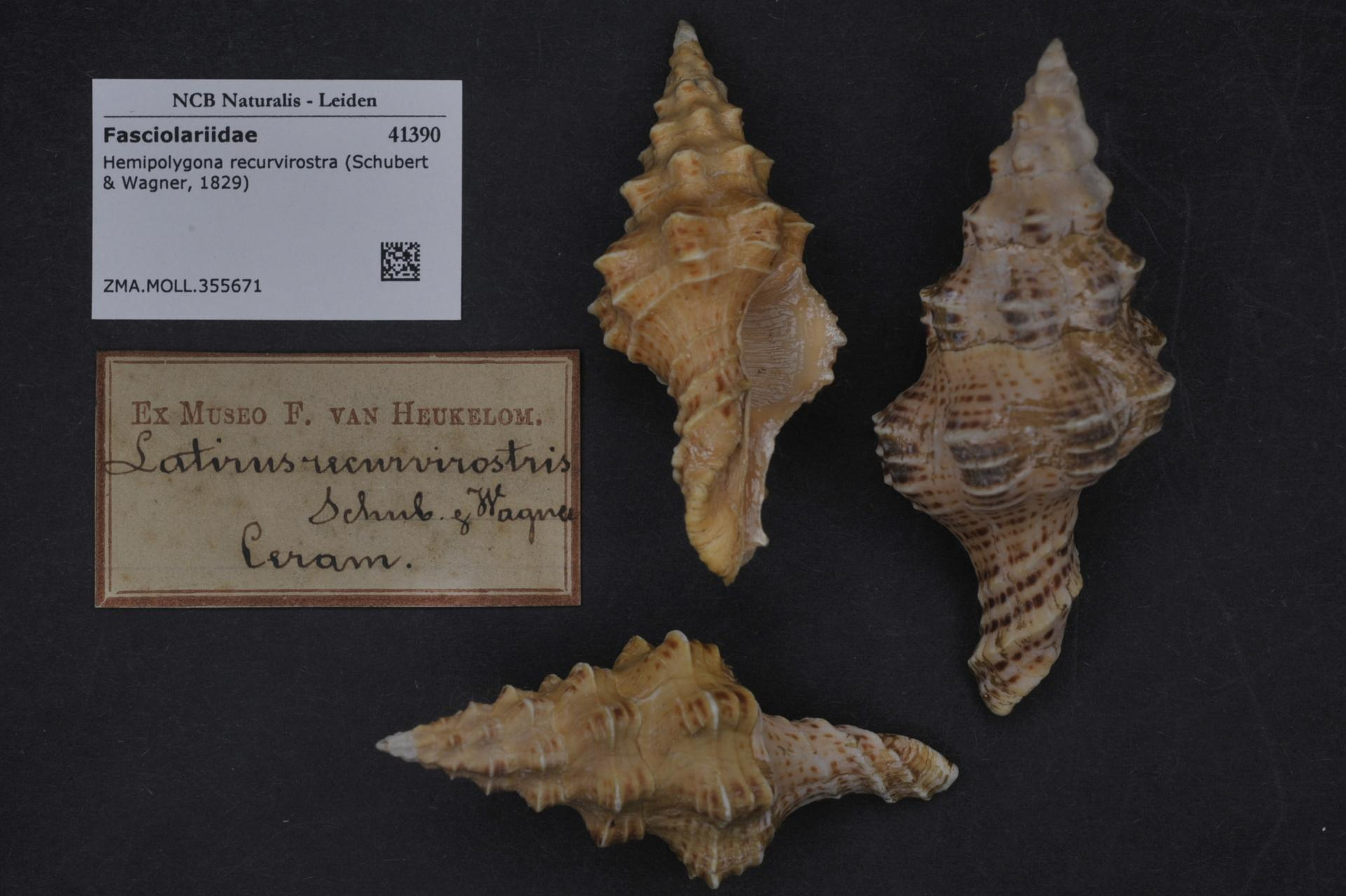
- Hemipolygona recurvirostra

Scientific classification
- Kingdom: Animalia
- Phylum: Mollusca
- Class: Gastropoda
- Subclass: Caenogastropoda
- Order: Neogastropoda
- Superfamily: Buccinoidea
- Family: Fasciolariidae
- Genus: Hemipolygona; Rovereto, 1899

Type species
- Chascax maderensis R. B. Watson, 1873

Synonyms
- Chasca Clench & Aguayo, 1941 (Spelling error); Chascax R. B. Watson, 1873 (Junior homonym of Chascax Ritgen, 1829 [Reptilia]; Hemipolygona is a replacement name.)

= Hemipolygona =

Genus of sea snails

Hemipolygona is a genus of sea snails, marine gastropod mollusks in the family Fasciolariidae, the spindle snails, the tulip snails and their allies.

== Species ==
Species within the genus Hemipolygona include:

- Hemipolygona aldeynzeri (Garcia, 2001)
- Hemipolygona amaliae (Küster & Kobelt, 1874)
- Hemipolygona armata (A. Adams, 1854)
- Hemipolygona beckyae (Snyder, 2000)
- Hemipolygona bonnieae (Smythe, 1985)
- Hemipolygona carinifera (Lamarck, 1816)
- Hemipolygona centrifuga (Dall, 1915)
- Hemipolygona cuna (Petuch, 1990)
- Hemipolygona distincta (A. Adams, 1855)
- Hemipolygona lamyi Snyder, 2007
- Hemipolygona mcgintyi (Pilsbry, 1939)
- Hemipolygona mosselensis (Tomlin, 1932)

Species brought into synonymy

- Hemipolygona honkeri Snyder, 2006: synonym of Bullockus honkeri (Snyder, 2006)
- Hemipolygona mcmurrayi Clench & Aguayo, 1941: synonym of Bullockus mcmurrayi (Clench & Aguayo, 1941)
- Hemipolygona recurvirostra (Schubert & Wagner, 1829): synonym of Nodolatirus recurvirostra (Schubert & J. A. Wagner, 1829)
- Hemipolygona varai (Bullock, 1970): synonym of Bullockus varai (Bullock, 1970)
