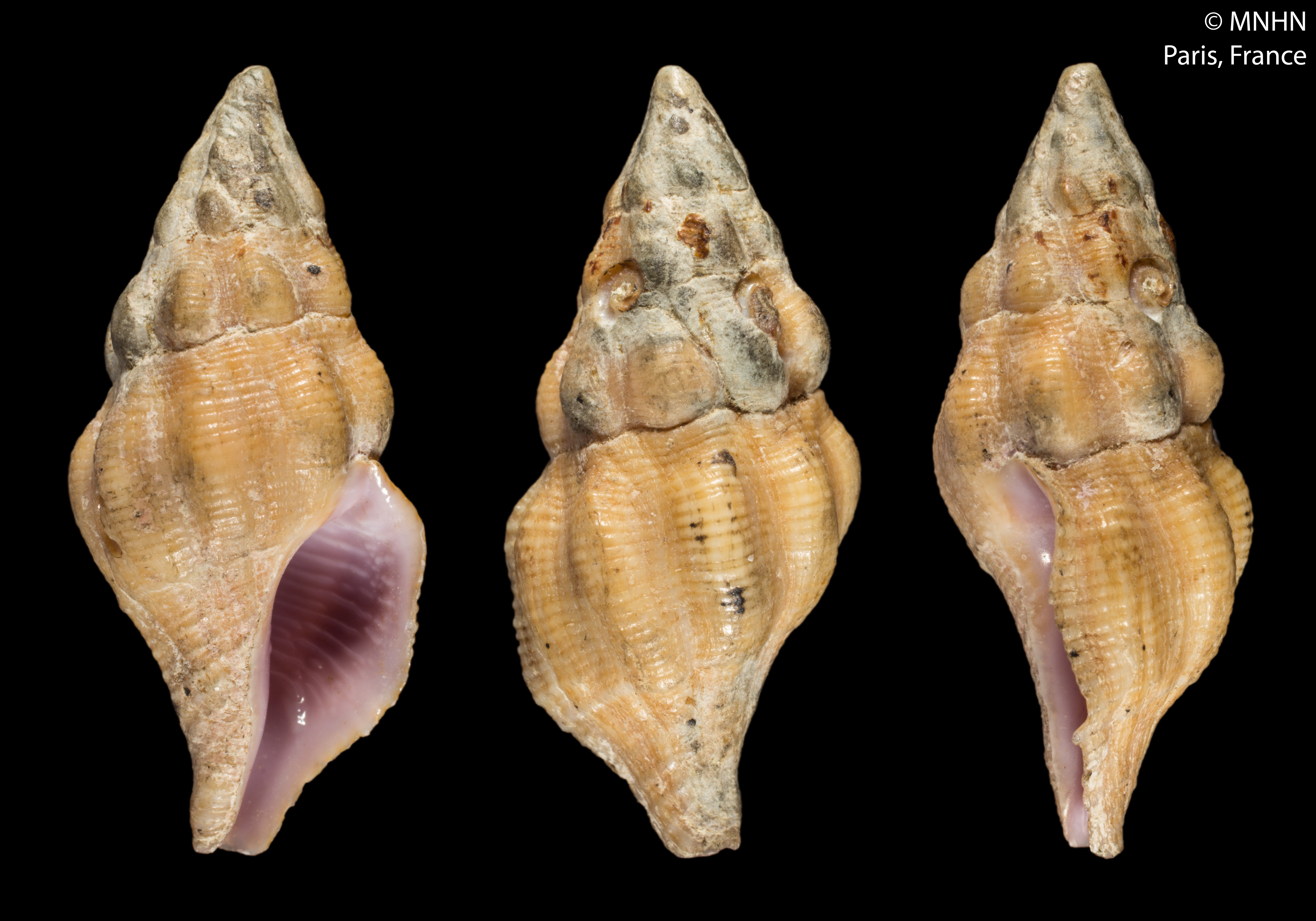
- Shell of Benimakia mariei (lectotype at MNHN, Paris)

Scientific classification
- Kingdom: Animalia
- Phylum: Mollusca
- Class: Gastropoda
- Subclass: Caenogastropoda
- Order: Neogastropoda
- Superfamily: Buccinoidea
- Family: Fasciolariidae
- Genus: Benimakia; Habe, 1958

Type species
- Turbinella rhodostoma, Dunker, 1860

= Benimakia =

Genus of gastropods

Benimakia is a genus of sea snails, marine gastropod mollusks in the family Fasciolariidae, the spindle snails, the tulip snails and their allies.

== Species ==
Species within the genus Benimakia include:

- Benimakia cloveri Snyder & Vermeij, 2008
- Benimakia delicata Vermeij & Snyder, 2003
- Benimakia fastigium (Reeve, 1847)
- Benimakia flavida (A. Adams, 1855)
- Benimakia lanceolata (Reeve, 1847)
- Benimakia mariei (Crosse, 1869)
- Benimakia mirabilis Bozzetti, 2018
- Benimakia nux Bouchet & Snyder, 2013
- Benimakia rhodostoma (Dunker, 1860)
- Benimakia rosadoi (Bozzetti, 2002)
- Benimakia rubens (Lamarck, 1822)
- Benimakia rubus Bouchet & Snyder, 2013
- Benimakia sowerbyi (Melvill, 1907)
- Benimakia vermeiji Bouchet & Snyder, 2013

Species brought into synonymy

- Benimakia marquesana (Adams, 1855): synonym of Peristernia marquesana (A. Adams, 1855)
- Benimakia nodata (Gmelin, 1791): synonym of Nodolatirus nodatus (Gmelin, 1791)
- Benimakia ogum (Petuch, 1979): synonym of Pustulatirus ogum (Petuch, 1979)
- Benimakia robillardi (Tapparone-Canefri, 1879): synonym of Nodolatirus robillardi (Tapparone Canefri, 1879)
