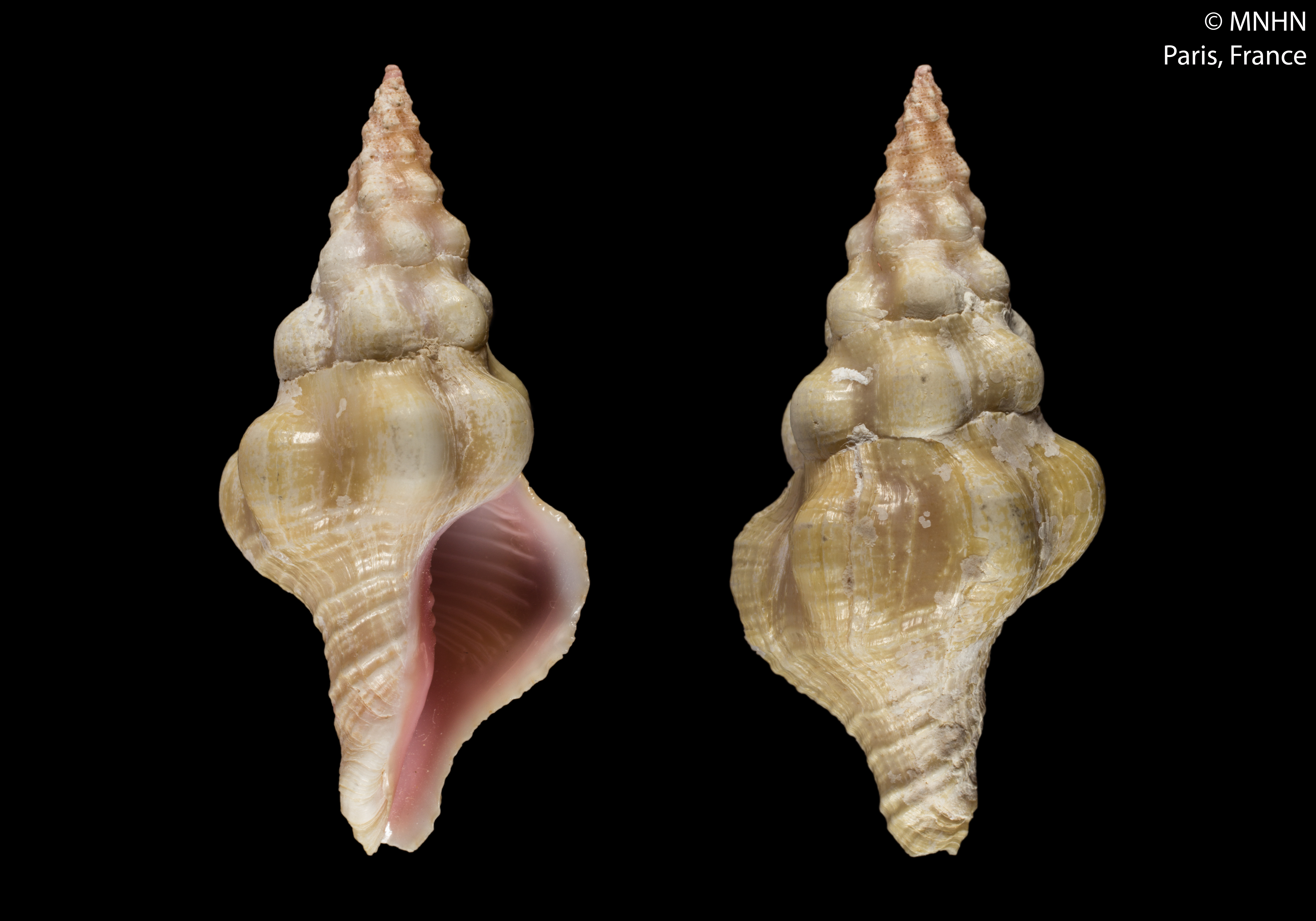

Scientific classification
- Kingdom: Animalia
- Phylum: Mollusca
- Class: Gastropoda
- Subclass: Caenogastropoda
- Order: Neogastropoda
- Family: Fasciolariidae
- Genus: Nodolatirus
- Species: N. rapanus

Binomial name
- Nodolatirus rapanus Bouchet & M. A. Snyder, 2013

= Nodolatirus rapanus =

Species of gastropod

Nodolatirus rapanus is a species of sea snail, a marine gastropod mollusk in the family Fasciolariidae, commonly known as spindle and tulip snails.

== Description ==
The shell length reaches approximately 40–60 mm, with a robust fusiform shape and distinct axial ribs. Shell coloration ranges from pale tan to light brown with darker spiral bands.

== Taxonomy ==
This species was described in 2013 by Bouchet & Snyder as part of a genus revision in the Journal of Conchology.

== Distribution and habitat ==
Nodolatirus rapanus is endemic to the Austral Islands, particularly around Rapa Iti in French Polynesia. It inhabits shallow subtidal zones among rocky substrates and coral reefs.

== Ecology ==
As a neogastropod, it is likely carnivorous, preying on smaller invertebrates. Specific ecological studies on this species have not yet been published.

== Life cycle ==
It likely has planktonic larvae (veligers) after external fertilization before settling and maturing, similar to other members of Fasciolariidae.

== Significance ==
Its restricted distribution and specialized habitat suggest potential sensitivity to environmental changes, although it has not been evaluated for conservation status.
