= Hemipolygona mosselensis =

Scientific classification
- Kingdom: Animalia
- Phylum: Mollusca
- Class: Gastropoda
- Subclass: Caenogastropoda
- Order: Neogastropoda
- Family: Fasciolariidae
- Genus: Hemipolygona
- Species: H. mosselensis

Binomial name
- Hemipolygona mosselensis (Tomlin, 1932)

Synonyms
- Latirus mosselensis Tomlin, 1932

Species of gastropod

Hemipolygona mosselensis is a species of sea snail, a marine gastropod mollusk in the family Fasciolariidae, the spindle snails, the tulip snails and their allies.
