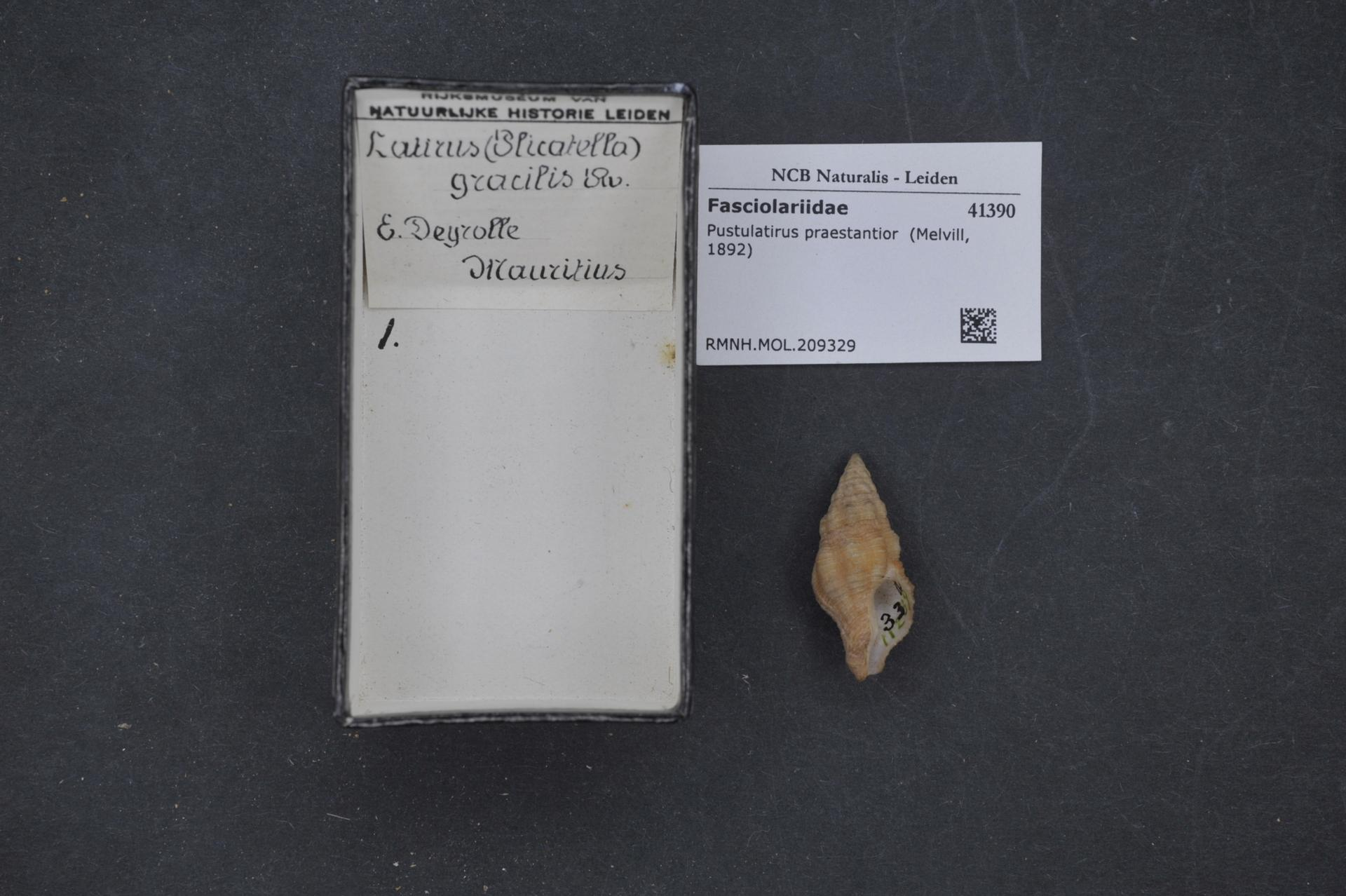

Scientific classification
- Kingdom: Animalia
- Phylum: Mollusca
- Class: Gastropoda
- Subclass: Caenogastropoda
- Order: Neogastropoda
- Family: Fasciolariidae
- Genus: Pustulatirus
- Species: P. praestantior

Binomial name
- Pustulatirus praestantior (Melvill, 1892)

Synonyms
- Latirus praestantior Melvill, 1892

= Pustulatirus praestantior =

Species of gastropod

Pustulatirus praestantior is a species of sea snail, a marine gastropod mollusk in the family Fasciolariidae, the spindle snails, the tulip snails and their allies.
