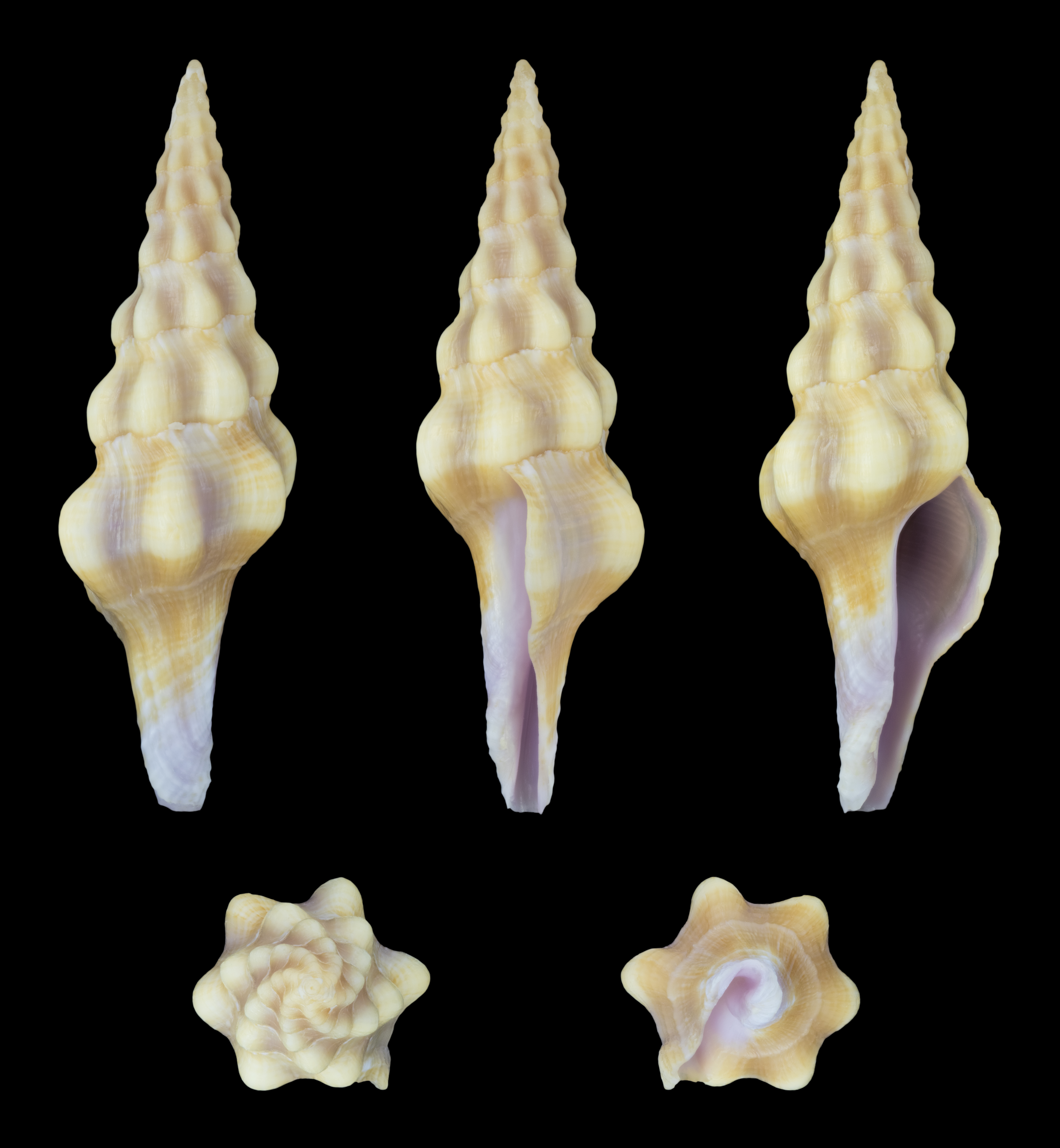
- Shell of Benimakia lanceolata

Scientific classification
- Kingdom: Animalia
- Phylum: Mollusca
- Class: Gastropoda
- Subclass: Caenogastropoda
- Order: Neogastropoda
- Family: Fasciolariidae
- Genus: Benimakia
- Species: B. lanceolata

Binomial name
- Benimakia lanceolata (Reeve, 1847)

Synonyms
- Latirus lanceolata (Reeve, 1847); Turbinella lanceolata Reeve, 1847

= Benimakia lanceolata =

Species of gastropod

Benimakia lanceolata is a species of sea snail, a marine gastropod mollusc in the family Fasciolariidae, the spindle snails, the tulip snails and their allies.

== Description ==
Long and pointy

== Distribution ==
This marine species occurs off Papua New Guinea.
