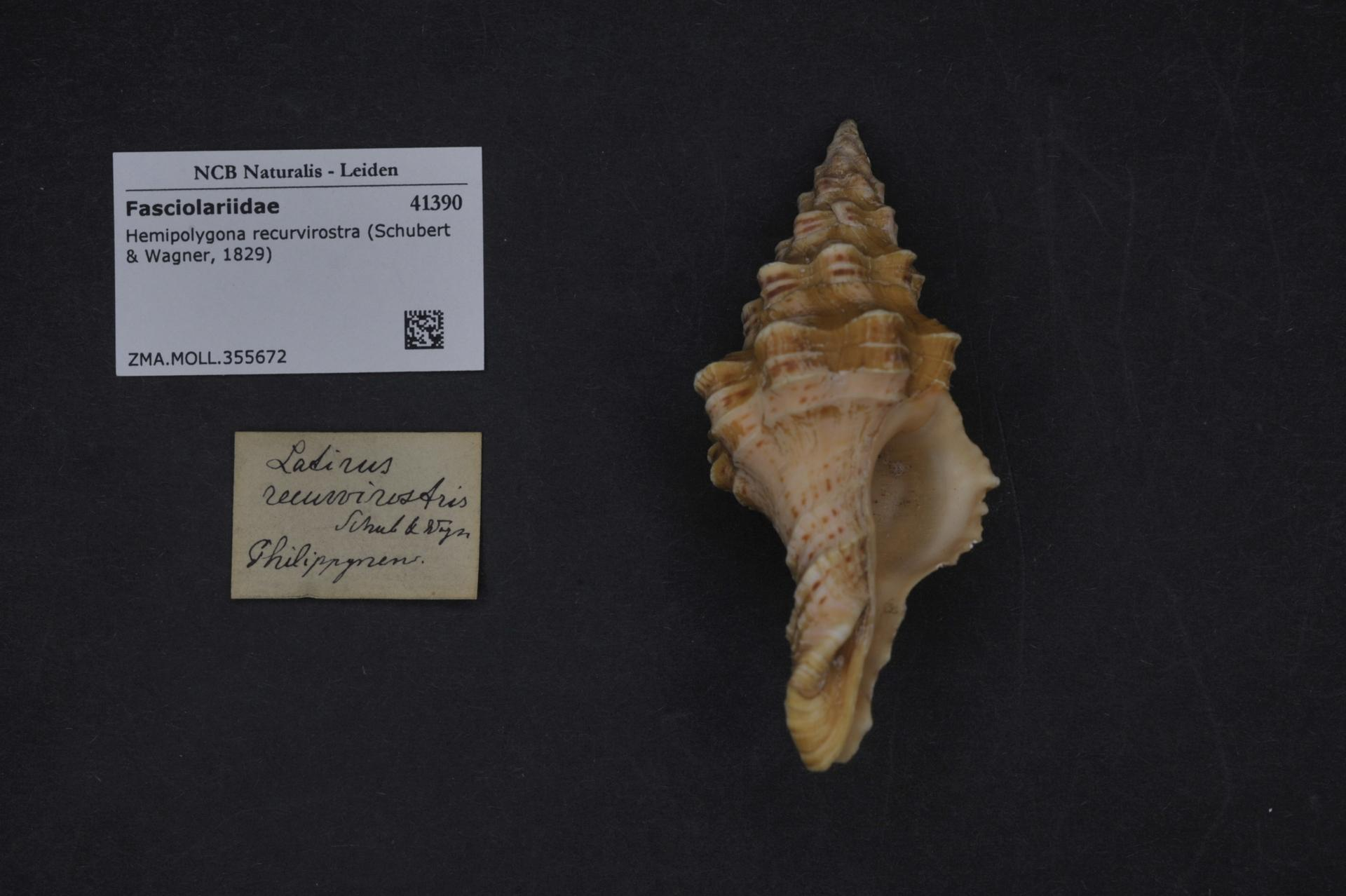
- Shell of Nodolatirus recurvirostra (specimen at Naturalis Biodiversity Center)

Scientific classification
- Kingdom: Animalia
- Phylum: Mollusca
- Class: Gastropoda
- Subclass: Caenogastropoda
- Order: Neogastropoda
- Family: Fasciolariidae
- Genus: Nodolatirus; Bouchet & Snyder, 2013

Type species
- Murex nodatus Gmelin, 1791

= Nodolatirus =

Genus of gastropods

Nodolatirus is a genus of sea snails in the family Fasciolariidae, first named in 2013.

== Species ==
There are four species within the genus Nodolatirus:

- Nodolatirus nodatus (Gmelin, 1791)
- Nodolatirus rapanus (Bouchet & Snyder, 2013)
- Nodolatirus recurvirostra (Schubert & J. A. Wagner, 1829)
- Nodolatirus robillardi (Tapparone Canefri, 1879)

Synonyms

- Nodolatirus recurvirostrus [sic]: synonym of Nodolatirus recurvirostra (Schubert & J. A. Wagner, 1829) (misspelling)
