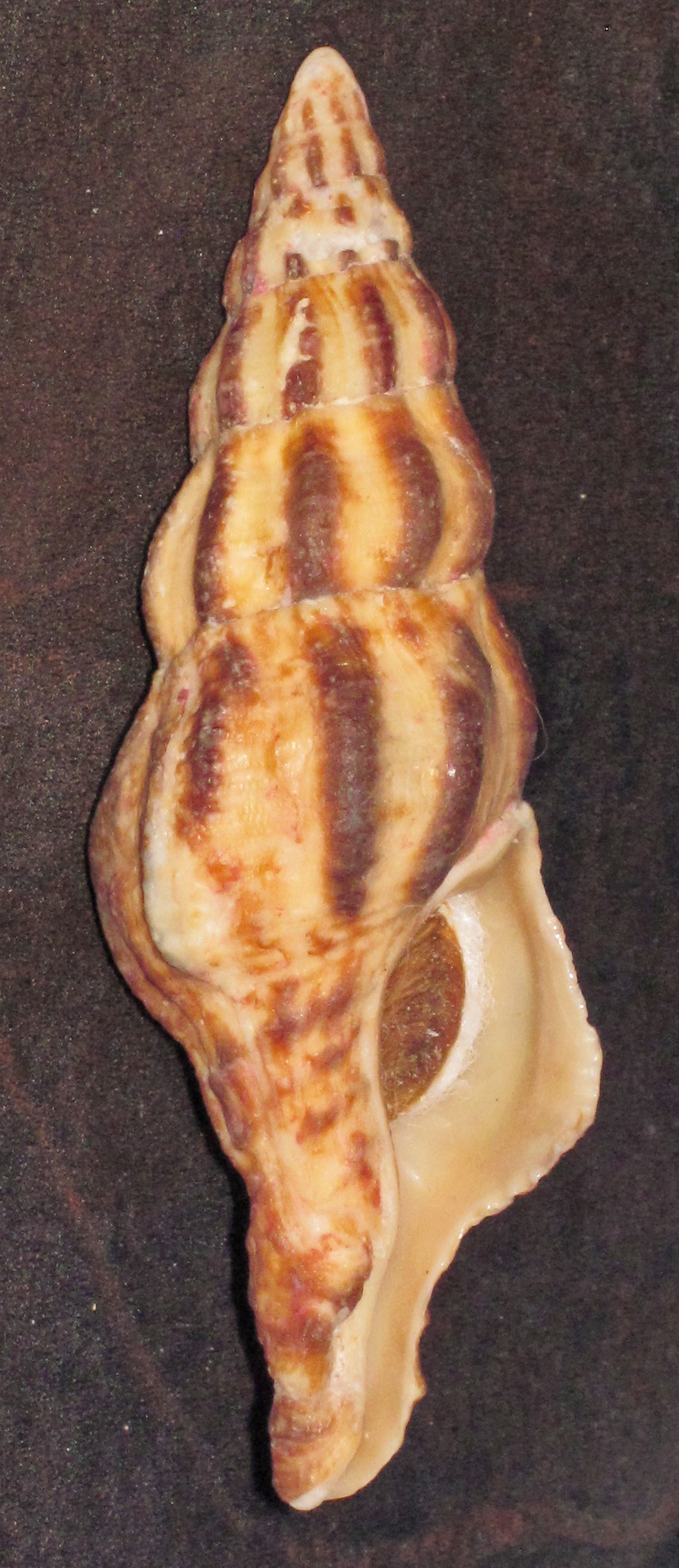

Scientific classification
- Kingdom: Animalia
- Phylum: Mollusca
- Class: Gastropoda
- Subclass: Caenogastropoda
- Order: Neogastropoda
- Family: Fasciolariidae
- Genus: Pustulatirus
- Species: P. sanguineus

Binomial name
- Pustulatirus sanguineus (Wood, 1828)

Synonyms
- Murex sanguineus Wood, 1828; Latirus sanguineus (Wood, 1828)

= Pustulatirus sanguineus =

Species of gastropod

Pustulatirus sanguineus is a species of sea snail, a marine gastropod mollusk in the family Fasciolariidae, the spindle snails, the tulip snails and their allies.
