= Benimakia sowerbyi =

Scientific classification
- Kingdom: Animalia
- Phylum: Mollusca
- Class: Gastropoda
- Subclass: Caenogastropoda
- Order: Neogastropoda
- Family: Fasciolariidae
- Genus: Benimakia
- Species: B. sowerbyi

Binomial name
- Benimakia sowerbyi (Melvill, 1907)

Synonyms
- Latirus sowerbyi Melvill, 1907; Peristernia sowerbyi (Melvill, 1907)

Species of gastropod

Benimakia sowerbyi is a species of sea snail, a marine gastropod mollusc in the family Fasciolariidae, the spindle snails, the tulip snails and their allies.
