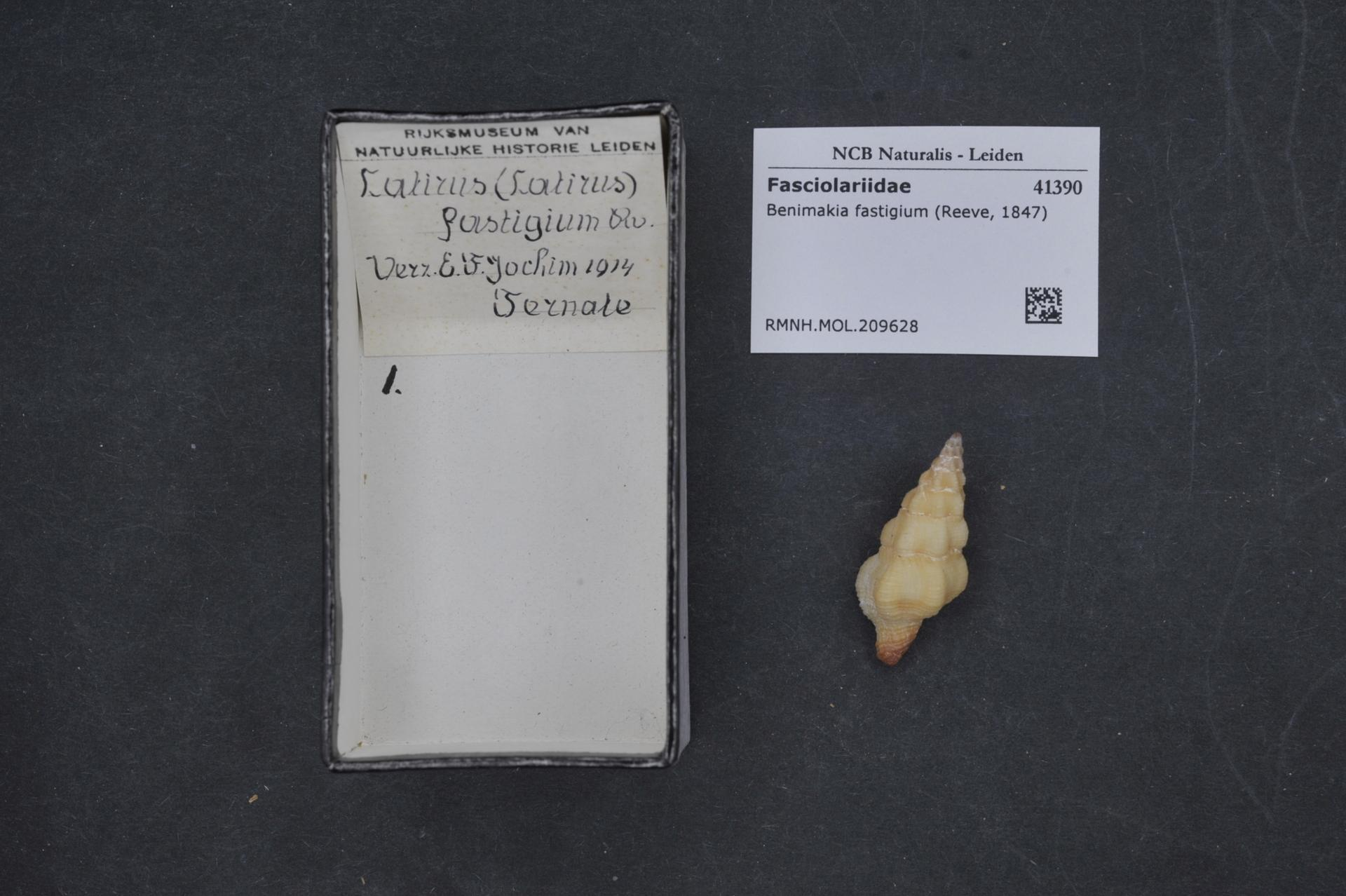

Scientific classification
- Kingdom: Animalia
- Phylum: Mollusca
- Class: Gastropoda
- Subclass: Caenogastropoda
- Order: Neogastropoda
- Family: Fasciolariidae
- Genus: Benimakia
- Species: B. fastigium

Binomial name
- Benimakia fastigium (Reeve, 1847)

Synonyms
- Latirus fastigium (Reeve, 1847); Peristernia fastigium (Reeve, 1847); Turbinella fastigium Reeve, 1847

= Benimakia fastigium =

Species of gastropod

Benimakia fastigium is a species of sea snail, a marine gastropod mollusc in the family Fasciolariidae, the spindle snails, the tulip snails and their allies.
