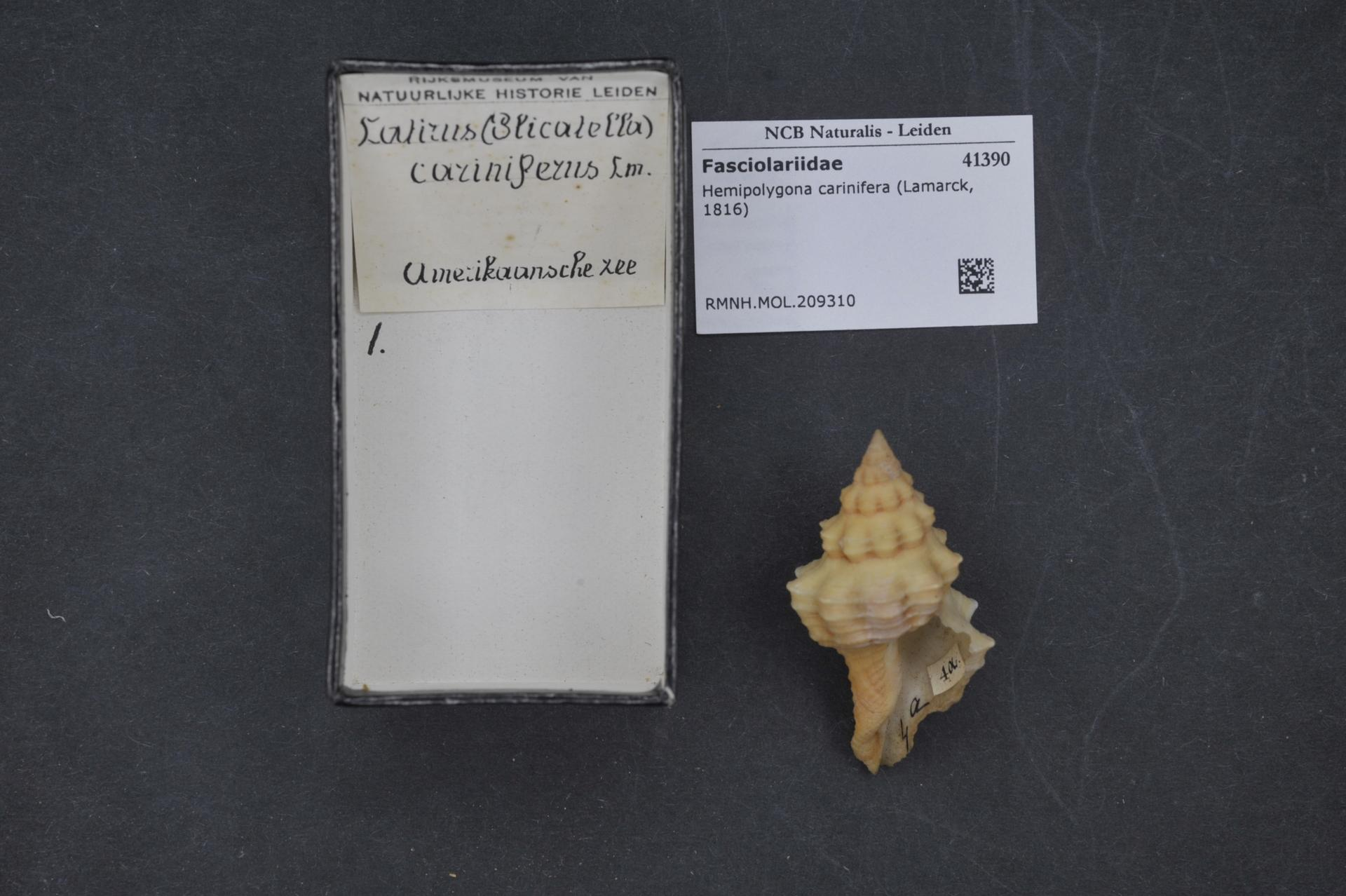
- Hemipolygona carinifera

Scientific classification
- Kingdom: Animalia
- Phylum: Mollusca
- Class: Gastropoda
- Subclass: Caenogastropoda
- Order: Neogastropoda
- Family: Fasciolariidae
- Genus: Hemipolygona
- Species: H. carinifera

Binomial name
- Hemipolygona carinifera (Lamarck, 1816)

Synonyms
- Fusus carinifer Lamarck, 1816; Latirus carinifer (Lamarck, 1816)

= Hemipolygona carinifera =

Species of gastropod

Hemipolygona carinifera is a species of sea snail, a marine gastropod mollusk in the family Fasciolariidae, the spindle snails, the tulip snails and their allies.
