= Pustulatirus mediamericanus =

Scientific classification
- Kingdom: Animalia
- Phylum: Mollusca
- Class: Gastropoda
- Subclass: Caenogastropoda
- Order: Neogastropoda
- Family: Fasciolariidae
- Genus: Pustulatirus
- Species: P. mediamericanus

Binomial name
- Pustulatirus mediamericanus (Hertlein & Strong, 1951)

Synonyms
- Latirus mediamericanus Hertlein & Strong, 1951

Species of gastropod

Pustulatirus mediamericanus is a species of sea snail, a marine gastropod mollusk in the family Fasciolariidae, the spindle snails, the tulip snails and their allies.
