= Bullockus pseudovarai =

Scientific classification
- Kingdom: Animalia
- Phylum: Mollusca
- Class: Gastropoda
- Subclass: Caenogastropoda
- Order: Neogastropoda
- Family: Fasciolariidae
- Genus: Bullockus
- Species: B. pseudovarai

Binomial name
- Bullockus pseudovarai Lyons & Snyder, 2008

Species of gastropod

Bullockus pseudovarai is a species of sea snail, a marine gastropod mollusk in the family Fasciolariidae, the spindle snails, the tulip snails and their allies.
