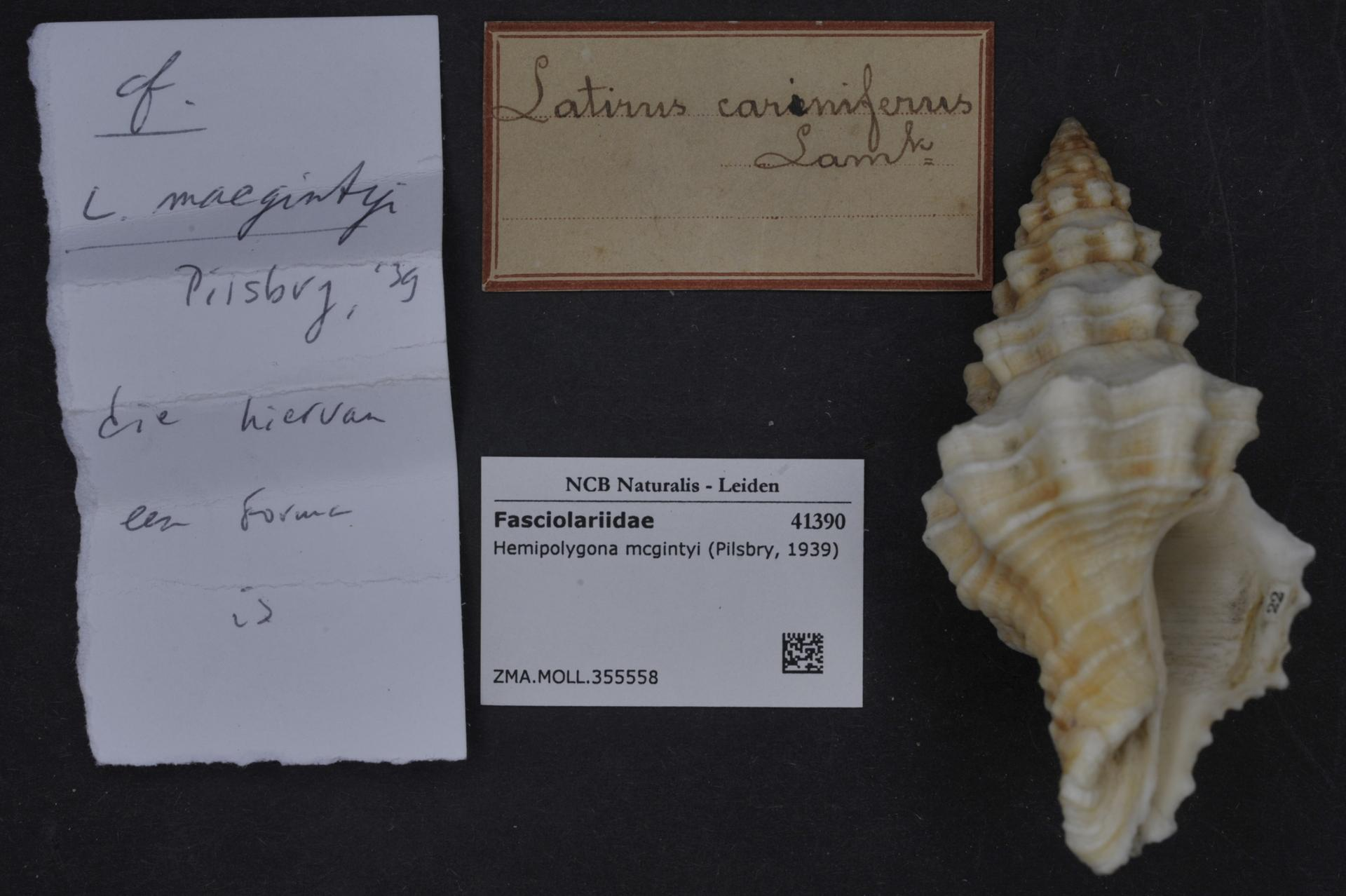

Scientific classification
- Kingdom: Animalia
- Phylum: Mollusca
- Class: Gastropoda
- Subclass: Caenogastropoda
- Order: Neogastropoda
- Family: Fasciolariidae
- Genus: Hemipolygona
- Species: H. mcgintyi

Binomial name
- Hemipolygona mcgintyi (Pilsbry, 1939)

= Hemipolygona mcgintyi =

Species of gastropod

Hemipolygona mcgintyi is a species of sea snail, a marine gastropod mollusk in the family Fasciolariidae, the spindle snails, the tulip snails and their allies.
