= Benimakia cloveri =

Scientific classification
- Kingdom: Animalia
- Phylum: Mollusca
- Class: Gastropoda
- Subclass: Caenogastropoda
- Order: Neogastropoda
- Family: Fasciolariidae
- Genus: Benimakia
- Species: B. cloveri

Binomial name
- Benimakia cloveri Snyder & Vermeij, 2008

Species of gastropod

Benimakia cloveri is a species of sea snail, a marine gastropod mollusc in the family Fasciolariidae, the spindle snails, the tulip snails and their allies.
