= Pustulatirus attenuatus =

Scientific classification
- Kingdom: Animalia
- Phylum: Mollusca
- Class: Gastropoda
- Subclass: Caenogastropoda
- Order: Neogastropoda
- Family: Fasciolariidae
- Genus: Pustulatirus
- Species: P. attenuatus

Binomial name
- Pustulatirus attenuatus (Reeve, 1847)

Synonyms
- Latirus attenuata (Reeve, 1847); Turbinella attenuata Reeve, 1847

Species of gastropod

Pustulatirus attenuatus is a species of sea snail, a marine gastropod mollusk in the family Fasciolariidae, the spindle snails, the tulip snails and their allies.
