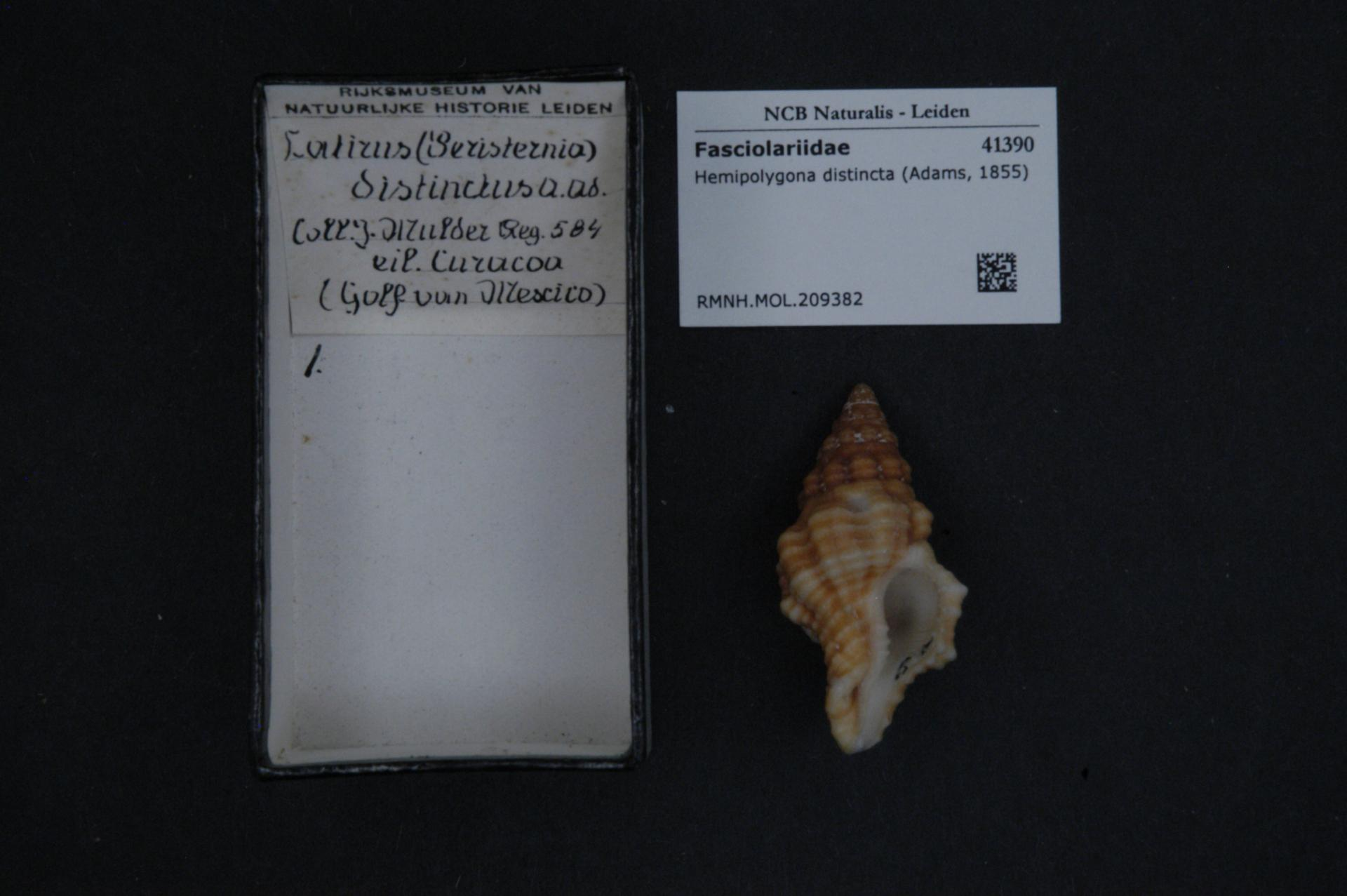
- Preserved specimen - Hemipolygona distincta (Adams, 1855)

Scientific classification
- Kingdom: Animalia
- Phylum: Mollusca
- Class: Gastropoda
- Subclass: Caenogastropoda
- Order: Neogastropoda
- Family: Fasciolariidae
- Genus: Hemipolygona
- Species: H. distincta

Binomial name
- Hemipolygona distincta (A. Adams, 1855)

= Hemipolygona distincta =

Species of gastropod

Hemipolygona distincta is a species of sea snail, a marine gastropod mollusk in the family Fasciolariidae, the spindle snails, the tulip snails and their allies.
