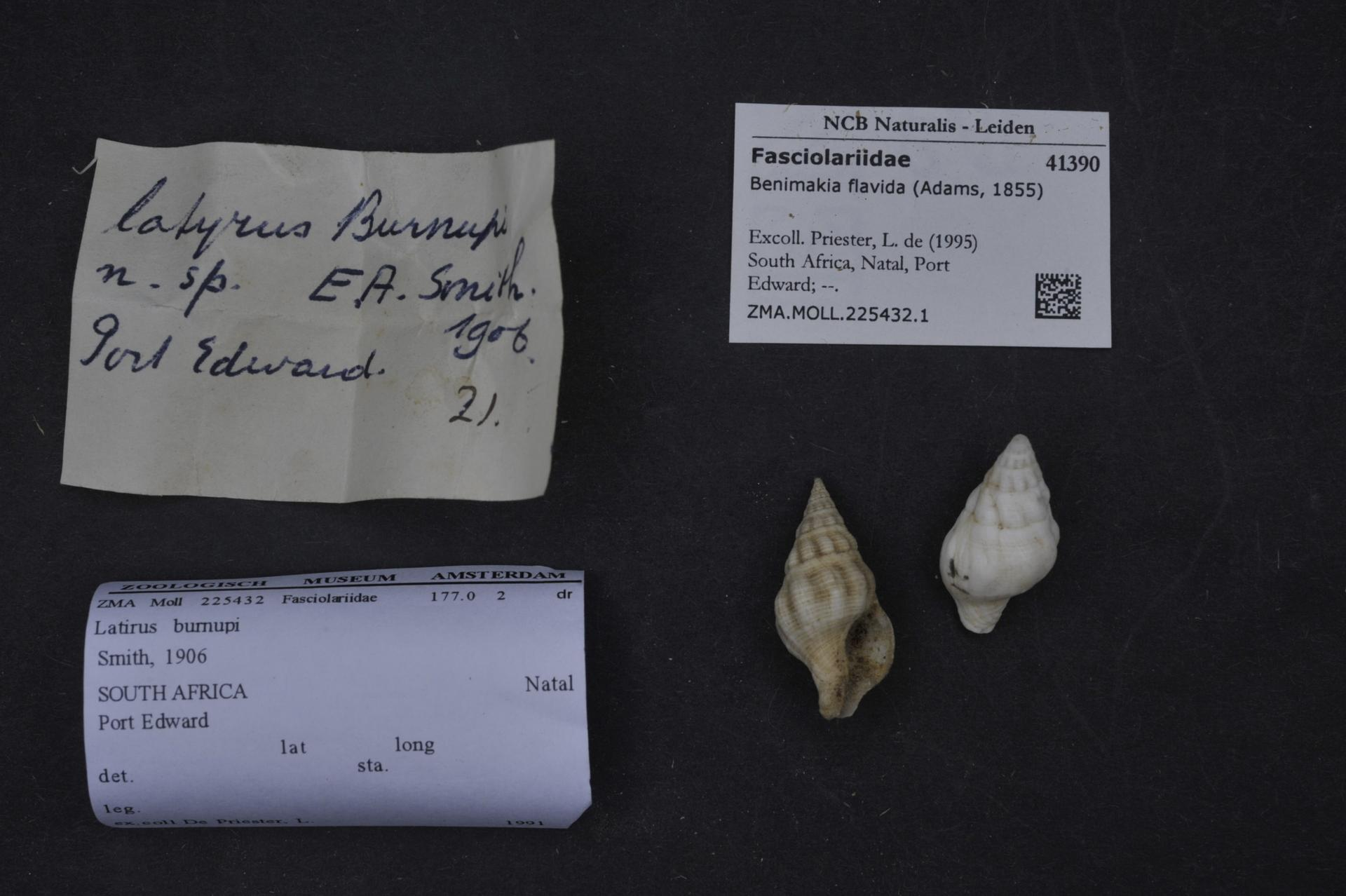

Scientific classification
- Kingdom: Animalia
- Phylum: Mollusca
- Class: Gastropoda
- Subclass: Caenogastropoda
- Order: Neogastropoda
- Family: Fasciolariidae
- Genus: Benimakia
- Species: B. flavida

Binomial name
- Benimakia flavida (A. Adams, 1855)

Synonyms
- Latirus burnupi E. A. Smith, 1906; Latirus flavidus A. Adams, 1855 (original combination)

= Benimakia flavida =

Species of gastropod

Benimakia flavida is a species of sea snail, a marine gastropod mollusc in the family Fasciolariidae, the spindle snails, the tulip snails and their allies.

== Distribution ==
This marine species occurs off the Philippines.
