= Hemipolygona centrifuga =

Scientific classification
- Kingdom: Animalia
- Phylum: Mollusca
- Class: Gastropoda
- Subclass: Caenogastropoda
- Order: Neogastropoda
- Family: Fasciolariidae
- Genus: Hemipolygona
- Species: H. centrifuga

Binomial name
- Hemipolygona centrifuga (Dall, 1915)

Synonyms
- Fusus centrifugus Dall, 1915; Latirus centrifugus (Dall, 1915)

Species of gastropod

Hemipolygona centrifuga is a species of sea snail, a marine gastropod mollusk in the family Fasciolariidae, the spindle snails, the tulip snails and their allies.
