= Benimakia rosadoi =

Scientific classification
- Kingdom: Animalia
- Phylum: Mollusca
- Class: Gastropoda
- Subclass: Caenogastropoda
- Order: Neogastropoda
- Family: Fasciolariidae
- Genus: Benimakia
- Species: B. rosadoi

Binomial name
- Benimakia rosadoi (Bozzetti, 2002)

Synonyms
- Latirus rosadoi Bozzetti, 2002 (original combination)

Species of gastropod

Benimakia rosadoi is a species of sea snail, a marine gastropod mollusc in the family Fasciolariidae, the spindle snails, the tulip snails and their allies.
