= Benimakia rhodostoma =

Scientific classification
- Kingdom: Animalia
- Phylum: Mollusca
- Class: Gastropoda
- Subclass: Caenogastropoda
- Order: Neogastropoda
- Family: Fasciolariidae
- Genus: Benimakia
- Species: B. rhodostoma

Binomial name
- Benimakia rhodostoma (Dunker, 1860)

Synonyms
- Turbinella rhodostoma Dunker, 1860; Plicatella rhodostoma (Dunker, 1860)

Species of gastropod

Benimakia rhodostoma is a species of sea snail, a marine gastropod mollusc in the family Fasciolariidae, the spindle snails, the tulip snails and their allies.
