= Hemipolygona amaliae =

Scientific classification
- Kingdom: Animalia
- Phylum: Mollusca
- Class: Gastropoda
- Subclass: Caenogastropoda
- Order: Neogastropoda
- Family: Fasciolariidae
- Genus: Hemipolygona
- Species: H. amaliae

Binomial name
- Hemipolygona amaliae (Küster & Kobelt, 1874)

Synonyms
- Turbinella amaliae Küster & Kobelt, 1874; Plicatella amaliae (Küster & Kobelt, 1874)

Species of gastropod

Hemipolygona amaliae is a species of sea snail, a marine gastropod mollusk in the family Fasciolariidae, the spindle snails, the tulip snails and their allies.
