= Pustulatirus virginensis =

Scientific classification
- Kingdom: Animalia
- Phylum: Mollusca
- Class: Gastropoda
- Subclass: Caenogastropoda
- Order: Neogastropoda
- Family: Fasciolariidae
- Genus: Pustulatirus
- Species: P. virginensis

Binomial name
- Pustulatirus virginensis (Abbott, 1958)

Synonyms
- Latirus karinae Nowell-Usticke, 1969; Latirus virginensis Abbott, 1958; Pustulatirus annulatus (Röding, 1798) sensu Vermeij & Snyder (2006)

Species of gastropod

Pustulatirus virginensis is a species of sea snail, a marine gastropod mollusk in the family Fasciolariidae, the spindle snails, the tulip snails and their allies.
