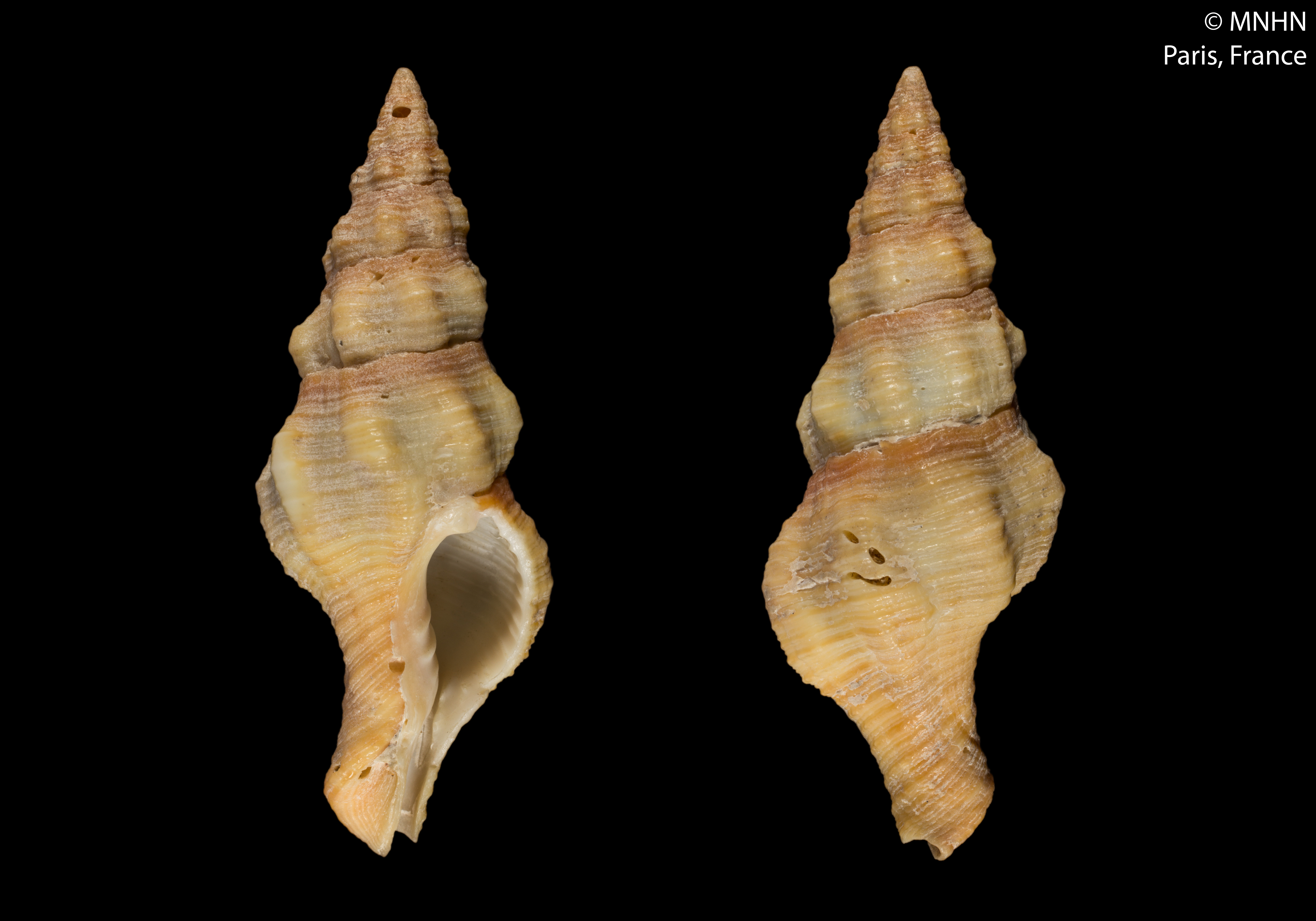
- Shell of Hemipolygona lamyi (holotype at MNHN, Paris)

Scientific classification
- Kingdom: Animalia
- Phylum: Mollusca
- Class: Gastropoda
- Subclass: Caenogastropoda
- Order: Neogastropoda
- Family: Fasciolariidae
- Genus: Hemipolygona
- Species: H. lamyi

Binomial name
- Hemipolygona lamyi Snyder, 2007

= Hemipolygona lamyi =

Species of gastropod

Hemipolygona lamyi is a species of sea snail, a marine gastropod mollusk in the family Fasciolariidae, the spindle snails, the tulip snails and their allies.

== Description ==
The length of the shell attains 74 mm.

== Distribution ==
This marine species occurs off Guadeloupe, Caribbean Sea.
