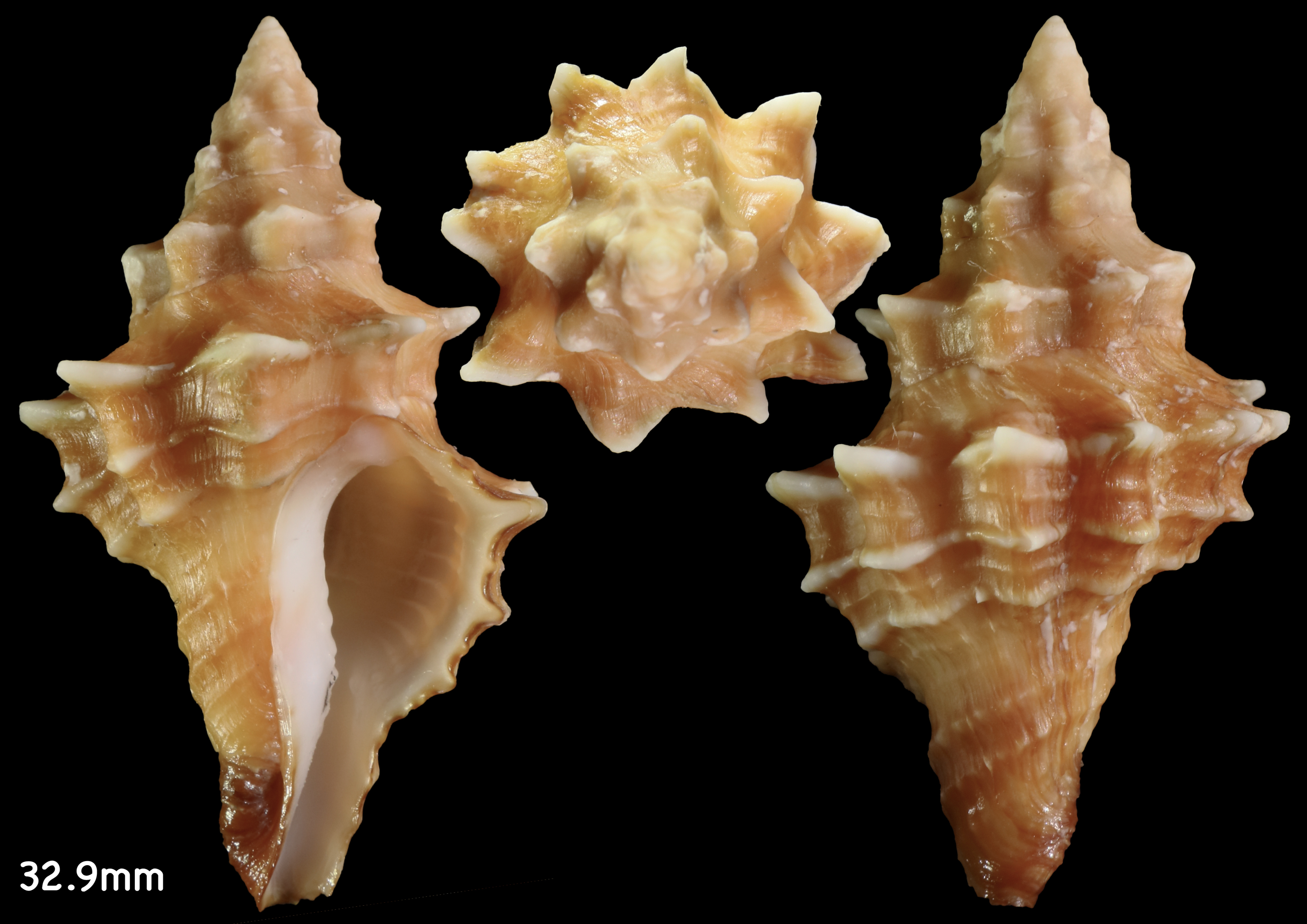

Scientific classification
- Kingdom: Animalia
- Phylum: Mollusca
- Class: Gastropoda
- Subclass: Caenogastropoda
- Order: Neogastropoda
- Family: Fasciolariidae
- Genus: Hemipolygona
- Species: H. armata

Binomial name
- Hemipolygona armata (Adams A., 1854)

Synonyms
- Latirus armatus A. Adams, 1854; Chascax maderensis Watson, 1873

= Hemipolygona armata =

Species of gastropod

Hemipolygona armata is a species of sea snail, a marine gastropod mollusk in the family Fasciolariidae, the spindle snails, the tulip snails and their allies.

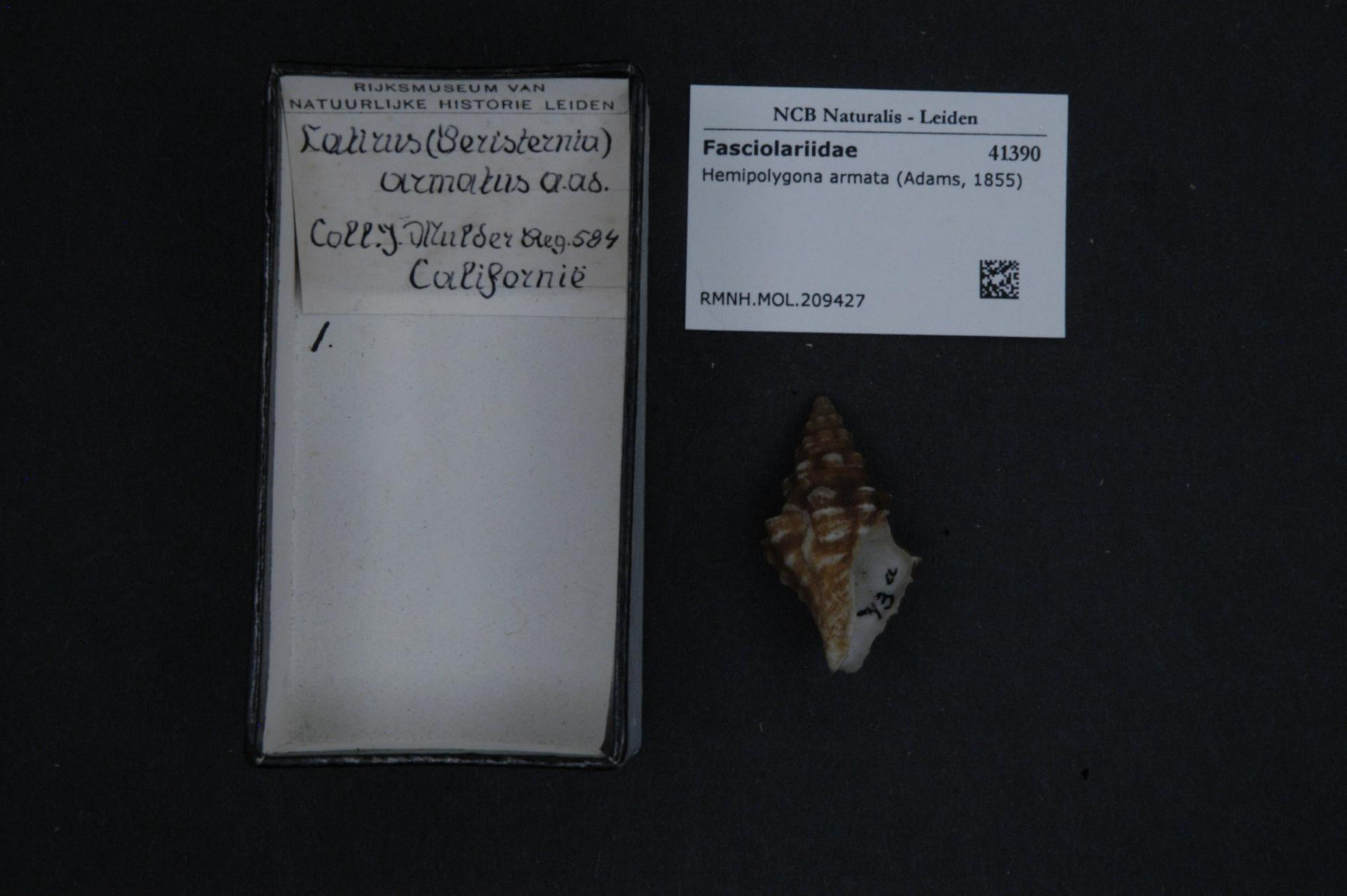

== Distribution ==
Hemipolygona armata has been found in coastal areas off of the Canary Islands, Cape Verde, and Togo in West Africa; Angola in southern Africa; and Somalia in East Africa.
