= Bullockus =

Scientific classification
- Kingdom: Animalia
- Phylum: Mollusca
- Class: Gastropoda
- Subclass: Caenogastropoda
- Order: Neogastropoda
- Superfamily: Buccinoidea
- Family: Fasciolariidae
- Genus: Bullockus; Lyons & Snyder, 2008

Type species
- Bullockus guesti Lyons & Snyder, 2008

Genus of sea snails

Bullockus is a genus of sea snails, marine gastropod mollusks in the family Fasciolariidae, the spindle snails, the tulip snails and their allies.

== Species ==
Species within the genus Bullockus include:

- Bullockus guesti Lyons & Snyder, 2008
- Bullockus honkeri (Snyder, 2006)
- Bullockus mcmurrayi (Clench & Aguayo, 1941)
- Bullockus pseudovarai Lyons & Snyder, 2008
- Bullockus varai (Bullock, 1970)
