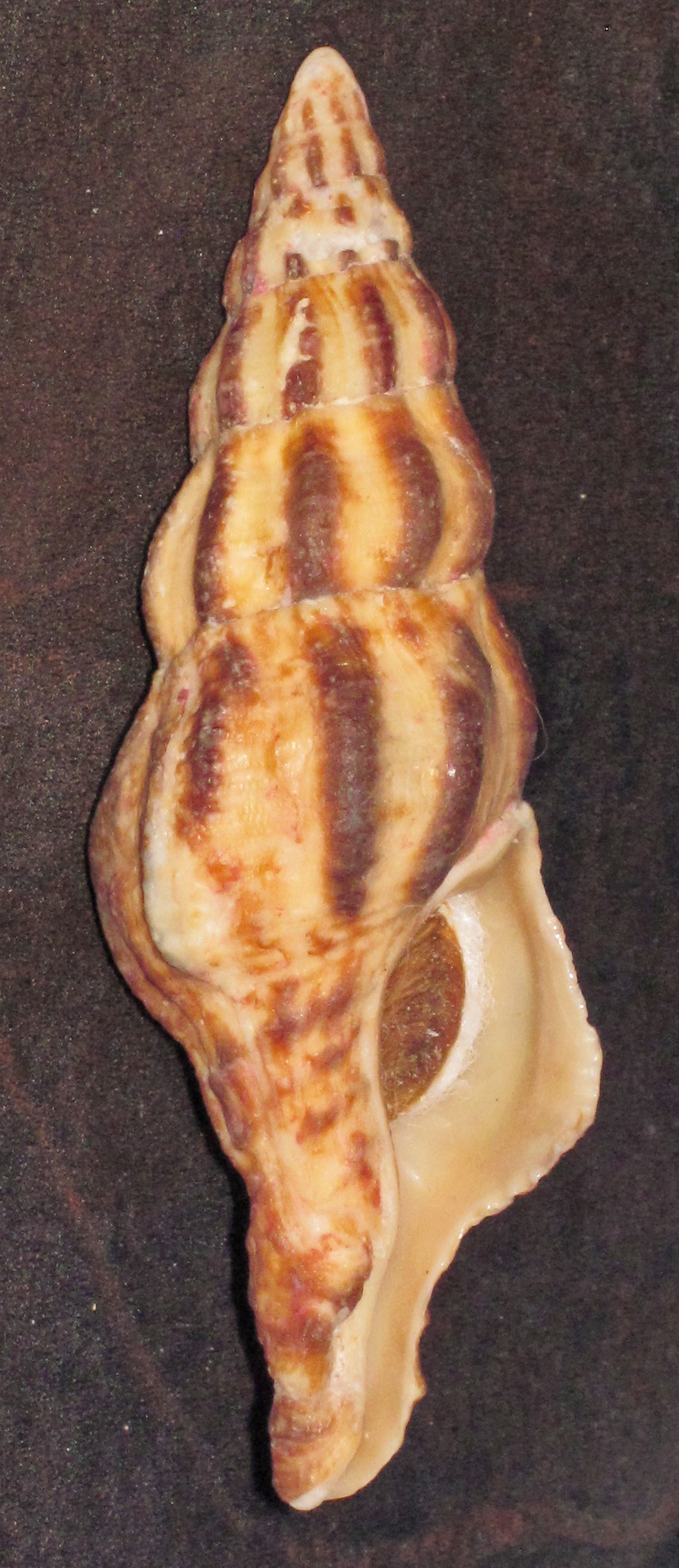
- Pustulatirus sanguineus

Scientific classification
- Kingdom: Animalia
- Phylum: Mollusca
- Class: Gastropoda
- Subclass: Caenogastropoda
- Order: Neogastropoda
- Superfamily: Buccinoidea
- Family: Fasciolariidae
- Genus: Pustulatirus; Vermeij & Snyder, 2006

Type species
- Latirus mediamericanus Hertlein & Strong, 1951

= Pustulatirus =

Genus of gastropods

Pustulatirus is a genus of sea snails, marine gastropod mollusks in the subfamoly Peristerninae of the family Fasciolariidae, the spindle snails, the tulip snails and their allies.

== Species ==
Species within the genus Pustulatirus include:

- Pustulatirus attenuatus (Reeve, 1847)
- Pustulatirus biocellatus Lyons & Snyder, 2013
- Pustulatirus eppi (Melvill, 1891)
- Pustulatirus hemphilli (Hertlein & Strong, 1951)
- Pustulatirus mediamericanus (Hertlein & Strong, 1951)
- Pustulatirus ogum (Petuch, 1979)
- Pustulatirus praestantior (Melvill, 1892)
- Pustulatirus sanguineus (Wood, 1828)
- Pustulatirus utilaensis Lyons & Snyder, 2013
- Pustulatirus virginensis (Abbott, 1958)
- Pustulatirus watermanorum Lyons & Snyder, 2013

Species brought into synonymy

- Pustulatirus annulatus (Röding, 1798): synonym of Pustulatirus virginensis (Abbott, 1958)
