= Pustulatirus hemphilli =

Scientific classification
- Kingdom: Animalia
- Phylum: Mollusca
- Class: Gastropoda
- Subclass: Caenogastropoda
- Order: Neogastropoda
- Family: Fasciolariidae
- Genus: Pustulatirus
- Species: P. hemphilli

Binomial name
- Pustulatirus hemphilli (Hertlein & Strong, 1951)

Synonyms
- Latirus hemphilli Hertlein & Strong, 1951

Species of sea snail

Pustulatirus hemphilli is a species of sea snail, a marine gastropod mollusk in the family Fasciolariidae, the spindle snails, the tulip snails and their allies.
