= Hemipolygona aldeynzeri =

Scientific classification
- Kingdom: Animalia
- Phylum: Mollusca
- Class: Gastropoda
- Subclass: Caenogastropoda
- Order: Neogastropoda
- Family: Fasciolariidae
- Genus: Hemipolygona
- Species: H. aldeynzeri

Binomial name
- Hemipolygona aldeynzeri (Garcia, 2001)

Synonyms
- Latirus aldeynzeri Garcia, 2001

Species of gastropod

Hemipolygona aldeynzeri is a species of sea snail, a marine gastropod mollusk in the family Fasciolariidae, the spindle and tulip snails. A rare deep-water, operculated species, it attains a size of 73 mm and lives near the Philippines.
