= Hemipolygona bonnieae =

Scientific classification
- Kingdom: Animalia
- Phylum: Mollusca
- Class: Gastropoda
- Subclass: Caenogastropoda
- Order: Neogastropoda
- Family: Fasciolariidae
- Genus: Hemipolygona
- Species: H. bonnieae

Binomial name
- Hemipolygona bonnieae (Smythe, 1985)

Synonyms
- Latirus bonnieae Smythe, 1985

Species of gastropod

Hemipolygona bonnieae is a species of sea snail, a marine gastropod mollusk in the family Fasciolariidae, the spindle snails, the tulip snails and their allies.
