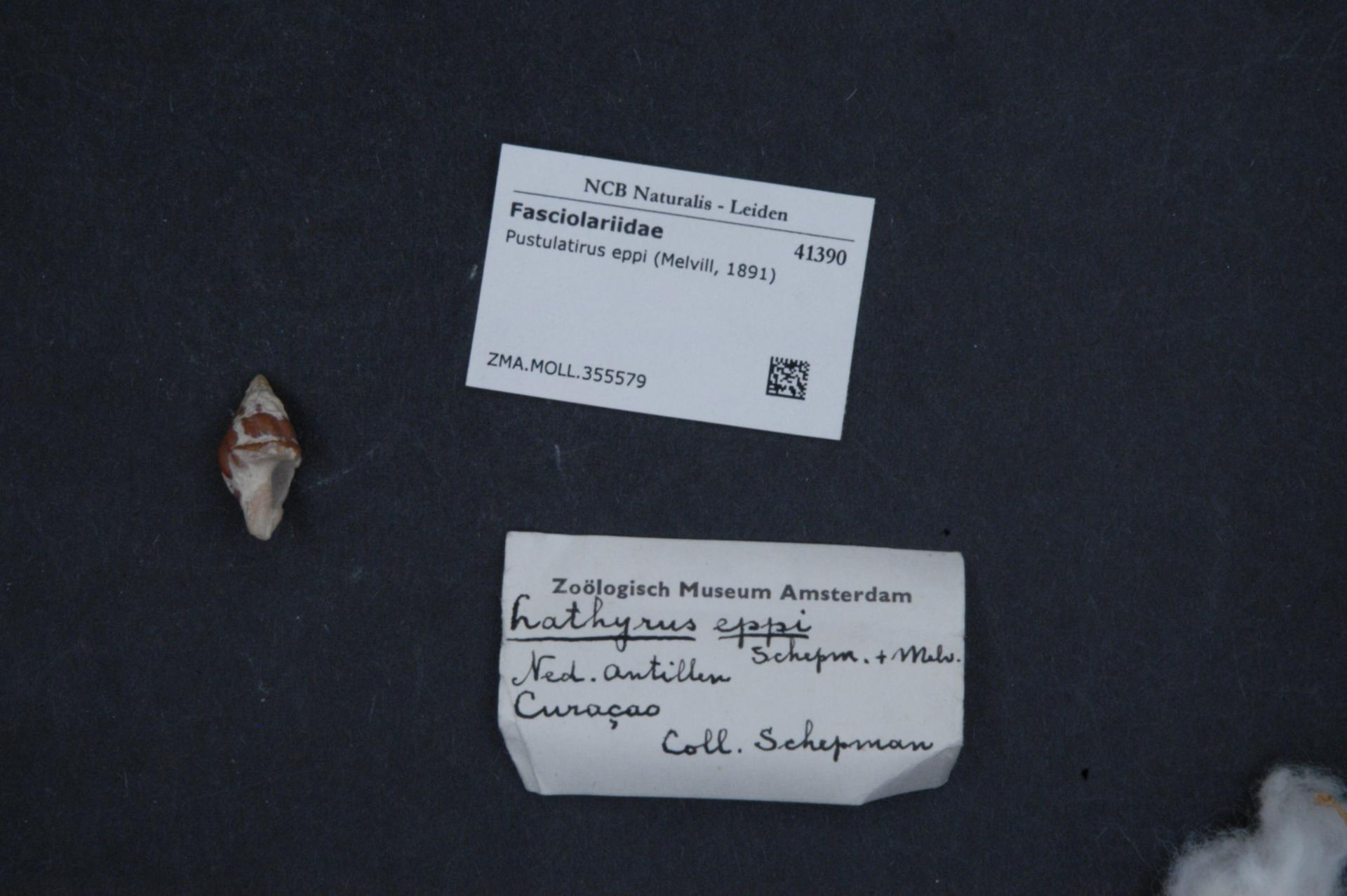

Scientific classification
- Kingdom: Animalia
- Phylum: Mollusca
- Class: Gastropoda
- Subclass: Caenogastropoda
- Order: Neogastropoda
- Family: Fasciolariidae
- Genus: Pustulatirus
- Species: P. eppi

Binomial name
- Pustulatirus eppi (Melvill, 1891)

Synonyms
- Latirus eppi Melvill, 1891

= Pustulatirus eppi =

Species of gastropod

Pustulatirus eppi is a species of sea snail, a marine gastropod mollusk in the family Fasciolariidae, the spindle snails, the tulip snails and their allies.
