= Nodolatirus recurvirostra =

Scientific classification
- Kingdom: Animalia
- Phylum: Mollusca
- Class: Gastropoda
- Subclass: Caenogastropoda
- Order: Neogastropoda
- Family: Fasciolariidae
- Genus: Nodolatirus
- Species: N. recurvirostra

Binomial name
- Nodolatirus recurvirostra (Schubert & Wagner, 1829)

Synonyms
- Hemipolygona recurvirostra (Schubert & J. A. Wagner, 1829); Latirus recurvirostra (Schubert & Wagner, 1829); Latirus recurvirostris [sic] (incorrect spelling); Nodolatirus recurvirostrus [sic] (misspelling); Turbinella recurvirostra Schubert & Wagner, 1829

Species of mollusc

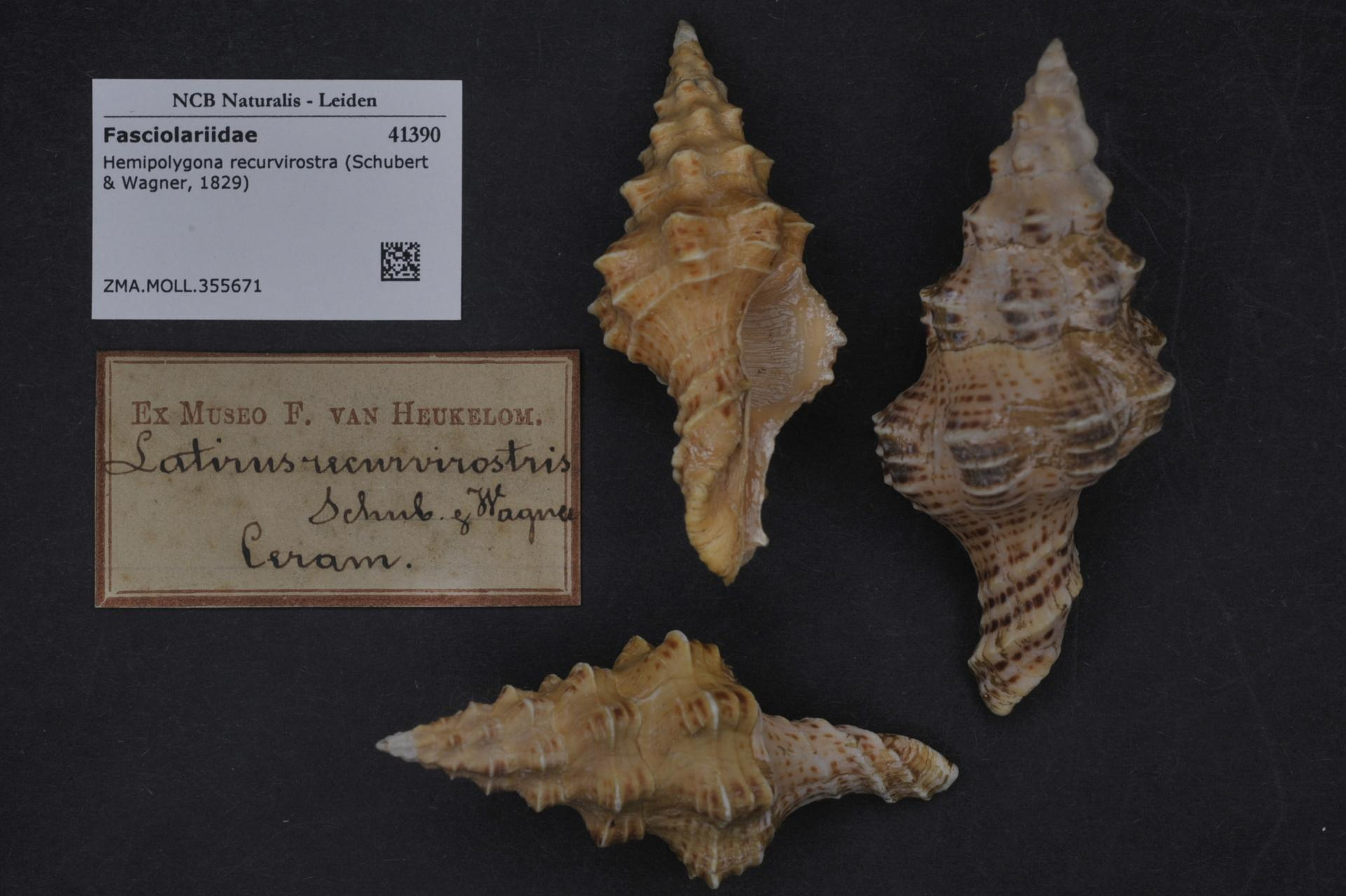
Three views of Nodolatirus recurvirostra, presented as preserved shell specimens with accompanying genera and authorship description

Nodolatirus recurvirostra is a species of sea snail, a marine gastropod mollusk in the family Fasciolariidae, the spindle snails, the tulip snails and their allies.
