= Pustulatirus ogum =

Scientific classification
- Kingdom: Animalia
- Phylum: Mollusca
- Class: Gastropoda
- Subclass: Caenogastropoda
- Order: Neogastropoda
- Family: Fasciolariidae
- Genus: Pustulatirus
- Species: P. ogum

Binomial name
- Pustulatirus ogum (Petuch, 1979)

Synonyms
- Benimakia ogum (Petuch, 1979); Latirus ogum Petuch, 1979 (original combination)

Species of gastropod

Pustulatirus ogum is a species of sea snail, a marine gastropod mollusk in the family Fasciolariidae, the spindle snails, the tulip snails and their allies.
