= Bullockus mcmurrayi =

Scientific classification
- Kingdom: Animalia
- Phylum: Mollusca
- Class: Gastropoda
- Subclass: Caenogastropoda
- Order: Neogastropoda
- Family: Fasciolariidae
- Genus: Bullockus
- Species: B. mcmurrayi

Binomial name
- Bullockus mcmurrayi (Clench & Aguayo, 1941)

Synonyms
- Hemipolygona mcmurrayi (Clench & Aguayo, 1941); Latirus mcmurrayi Clench & Aguayo, 1941

Species of gastropod

Bullockus mcmurrayi is a species of sea snail, a marine gastropod mollusk in the family Fasciolariidae, commonly knows as spindle snails and tulip snails. This species was first described in 1941 by Clench & Aguayo. Initially classified under the genus Latirus, but later reclassified into the genus Bullockus.
