= Nodolatirus robillardi =

Scientific classification
- Kingdom: Animalia
- Phylum: Mollusca
- Class: Gastropoda
- Subclass: Caenogastropoda
- Order: Neogastropoda
- Family: Fasciolariidae
- Genus: Nodolatirus
- Species: N. robillardi

Binomial name
- Nodolatirus robillardi (Tapparone-Canefri, 1879)

Synonyms
- Benimakia robillardi (Tapparone Canefri, 1879); Latirus robillardi Tapparone-Canefri, 1879

Species of gastropod

Nodolatirus robillardi is a species of sea snail, a marine gastropod mollusk in the family Fasciolariidae, the spindle snails, the tulip snails and their allies.
