= Bullockus honkeri =

Scientific classification
- Kingdom: Animalia
- Phylum: Mollusca
- Class: Gastropoda
- Subclass: Caenogastropoda
- Order: Neogastropoda
- Family: Fasciolariidae
- Genus: Bullockus
- Species: B. honkeri

Binomial name
- Bullockus honkeri (Snyder, 2006)

Synonyms
- Hemipolygona honkeri Snyder, 2006

Species of gastropod

Bullockus honkeri is a species of sea snail, a marine gastropod mollusk in the family Fasciolariidae, the spindle snails, the tulip snails and their allies.
