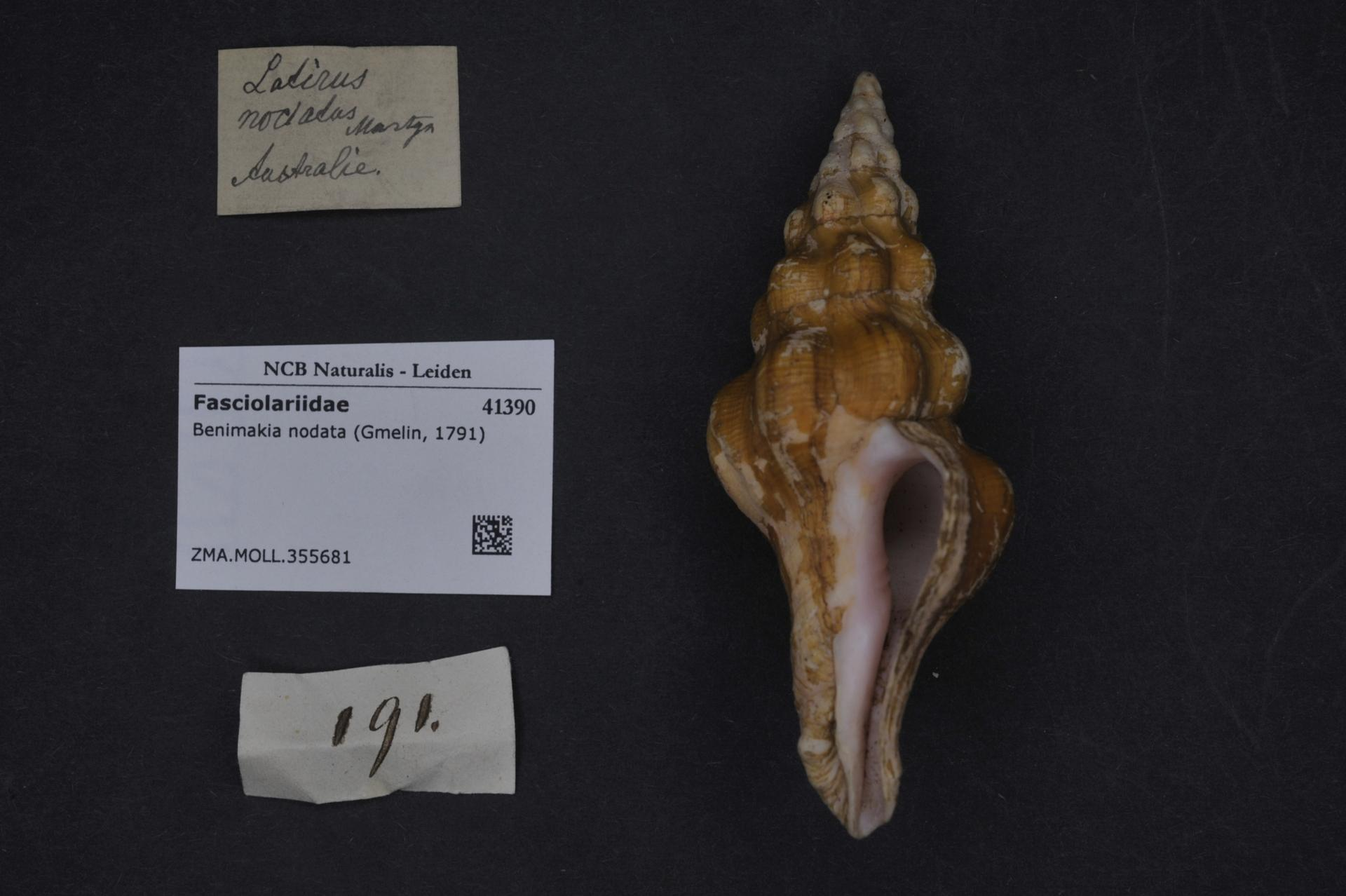
- Preserved specimen

Scientific classification
- Kingdom: Animalia
- Phylum: Mollusca
- Class: Gastropoda
- Subclass: Caenogastropoda
- Order: Neogastropoda
- Family: Fasciolariidae
- Genus: Nodolatirus
- Species: N. nodatus

Binomial name
- Nodolatirus nodatus (Gmelin, 1791)

Synonyms
- Benimakia nodata (Gmelin, 1791); Fusus rosaponti Lesson, 1842; Latirus nodatus (Gmelin, 1791); Latirus rosaponti (Lesson, 1842); Murex nodatus Gmelin, 1791; Murex rigidus W. Wood, 1828; Turbinella multinoda Petit de la Saussaye, 1842 (unnecessary new name for Fusus rosaponti)

= Nodolatirus nodatus =

Species of gastropod

Nodolatirus nodatus is a species of sea snail, a marine gastropod mollusk in the family Fasciolariidae, the spindle snails, the tulip snails and their allies.
