= Bullockus varai =

Scientific classification
- Kingdom: Animalia
- Phylum: Mollusca
- Class: Gastropoda
- Subclass: Caenogastropoda
- Order: Neogastropoda
- Family: Fasciolariidae
- Genus: Bullockus
- Species: B. varai

Binomial name
- Bullockus varai (Bullock, 1970)

Synonyms
- Hemipolygona varai (Bullock, 1970); Latirus varai Bullock, 1970

Species of gastropod

Bullockus varai is a species of sea snail, a marine gastropod mollusk in the family Fasciolariidae, the spindle snails, the tulip snails and their allies.
