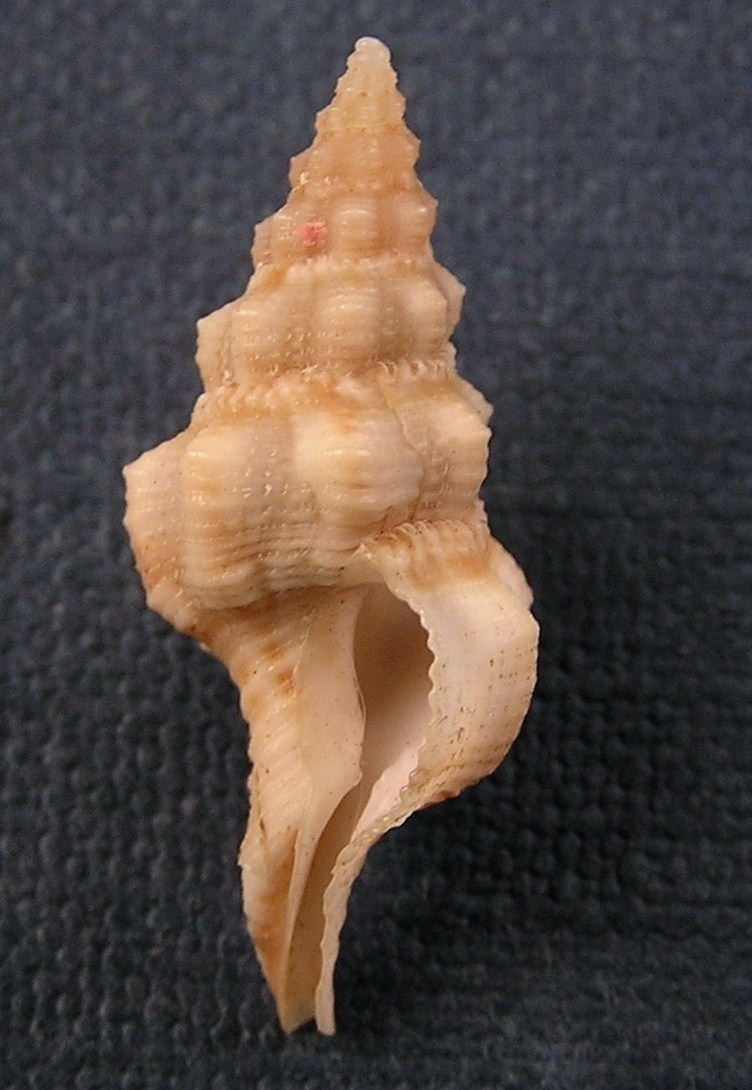
- Fusolatirus suduiraudi

Scientific classification
- Kingdom: Animalia
- Phylum: Mollusca
- Class: Gastropoda
- Subclass: Caenogastropoda
- Order: Neogastropoda
- Superfamily: Buccinoidea
- Family: Fasciolariidae
- Genus: Fusolatirus; Kuroda & Habe, 1971

Type species
- Peristernia pilsbryi Kuroda & Habe, 1952

= Fusolatirus =

Genus of gastropods

Fusolatirus is a genus of sea snails, marine gastropod mollusks in the subfamily Peristerniinae of the family Fasciolariidae, the spindle snails, the tulip snails and their allies.

== Species ==
According to the World Register of Marine Species (WoRMS) the following species with accepted names are included within the genus Fusolatirus :

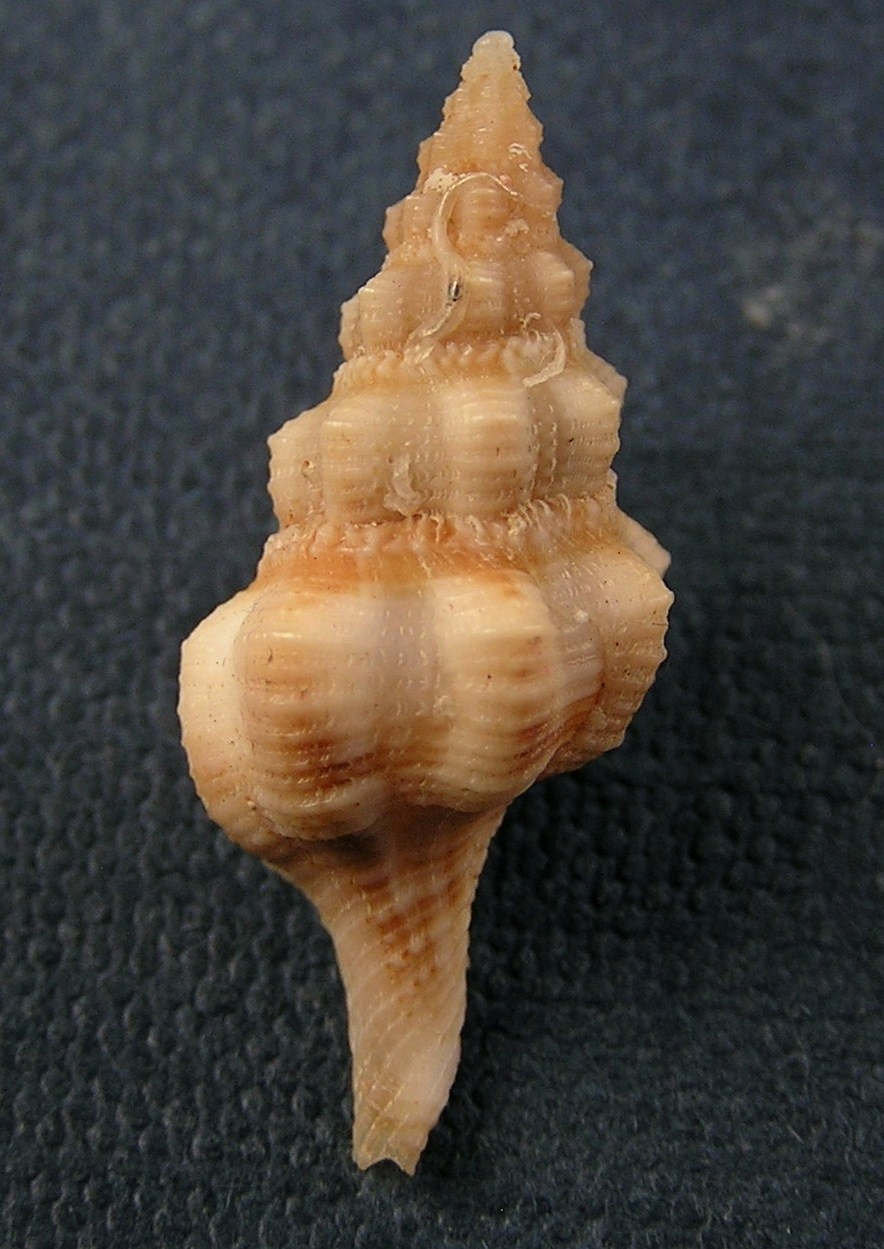
Fusolatirus suduiraudi

- Fusolatirus balicasagensis (Bozzetti, 1997)
- Fusolatirus brinkae (Lussi, 1996)
- Fusolatirus bruijnii (Tapparone Canefri, 1876)
- Fusolatirus coreanicus (Smith, 1879)
- Fusolatirus elsiae (Kilburn, 1975)
- Fusolatirus formosior (Melvill, 1891)
- Fusolatirus higoi Snyder & Callomon, 2005
- Fusolatirus kandai (Kuroda, 1950)
- Fusolatirus luteus Snyder & Bouchet, 2006
- Fusolatirus nana (Reeve, 1847)
- Fusolatirus pachyus Snyder & Bouchet, 2006
- Fusolatirus paetelianus (Küster & Kobelt, 1874)
- Fusolatirus pagodaeformis (Melvill, 1899)
- Fusolatirus pearsoni (Snyder, 2002)
- Fusolatirus rikae (Fraussen, 2003)
- Fusolatirus sarinae (Snyder, 2003)
- Fusolatirus suduirauti (Fraussen, 2003)

Species brought into synonymy

- Fusolatirus kurodai (Okutani & Sakurai, 1964): synonym of Granulifusus kurodai (Okutani & Sakurai, 1964)
- Fusolatirus kuroseanus Okutani, 1975: synonym of Okutanius kuroseanus (Okutani, 1975) (original combination)
- Fusolatirus nanus [sic] accepted as Fusolatirus nana (Reeve, 1847) (misspelling)
