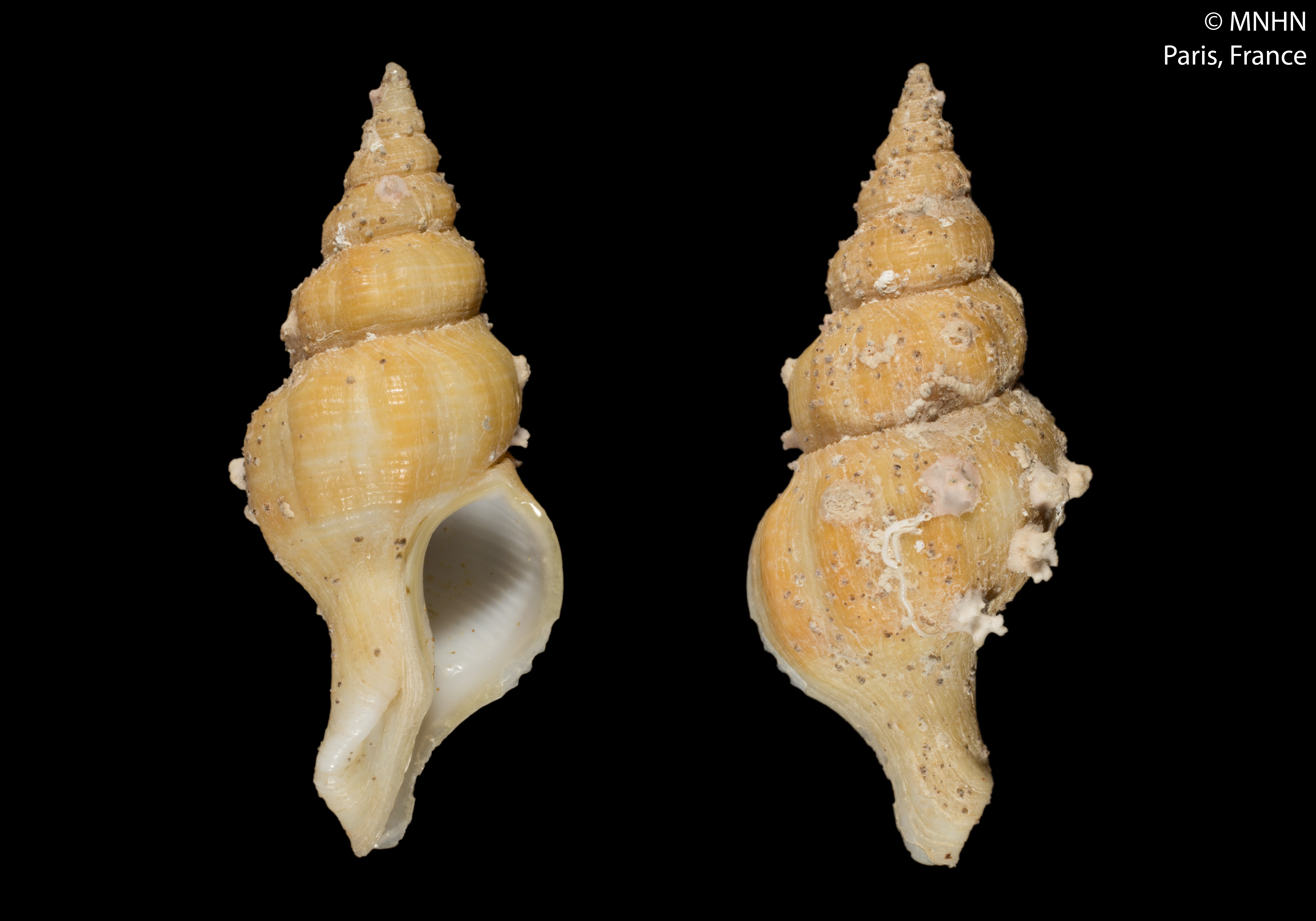

Scientific classification
- Kingdom: Animalia
- Phylum: Mollusca
- Class: Gastropoda
- Subclass: Caenogastropoda
- Order: Neogastropoda
- Family: Fasciolariidae
- Genus: Fusolatirus
- Species: F. luteus

Binomial name
- Fusolatirus luteus Snyder & Bouchet, 2006

= Fusolatirus luteus =

Species of gastropod

Fusolatirus luteus is a species of sea snails, a marine gastropod mollusc in the family Fasciolariidae, the spindle snails, the tulip snails and their allies.
