= Fusolatirus rikae =

Scientific classification
- Kingdom: Animalia
- Phylum: Mollusca
- Class: Gastropoda
- Subclass: Caenogastropoda
- Order: Neogastropoda
- Family: Fasciolariidae
- Genus: Fusolatirus
- Species: F. rikae

Binomial name
- Fusolatirus rikae (Fraussen, 2003)

Synonyms
- Euthria rikae Fraussen, 2003

Species of gastropod

Fusolatirus rikae is a species of sea snail, a marine gastropod mollusk in the family Fasciolariidae, the spindle snails, the tulip snails and their allies.
