= Granulifusus musasiensis =

Scientific classification
- Kingdom: Animalia
- Phylum: Mollusca
- Class: Gastropoda
- Subclass: Caenogastropoda
- Order: Neogastropoda
- Family: Fasciolariidae
- Genus: Granulifusus
- Species: G. musasiensis

Binomial name
- Granulifusus musasiensis (Makiyama, 1922)

Synonyms
- Fusinus niponicus musasiensis Makiyama, 1922 (basionym); † Granulifusus niponicus musasiensis Makiyama, 1922

Species of mollusc (fossil)

Granulifusus musasiensis is a species of sea snail, a marine gastropod mollusc in the family Fasciolariidae, the spindle snails, the tulip snails and their allies.
