= Granulifusus faurei =

Scientific classification
- Kingdom: Animalia
- Phylum: Mollusca
- Class: Gastropoda
- Subclass: Caenogastropoda
- Order: Neogastropoda
- Family: Fasciolariidae
- Genus: Granulifusus
- Species: G. faurei

Binomial name
- Granulifusus faurei (Barnard, 1959)

Synonyms
- Fusinus faurei (Barnard, 1959); Fusus faurei Barnard, 1959 (basionym)

Species of gastropod

Granulifusus faurei is a species of sea snail, a marine gastropod mollusc in the family Fasciolariidae, the spindle snails, the tulip snails and their allies.
