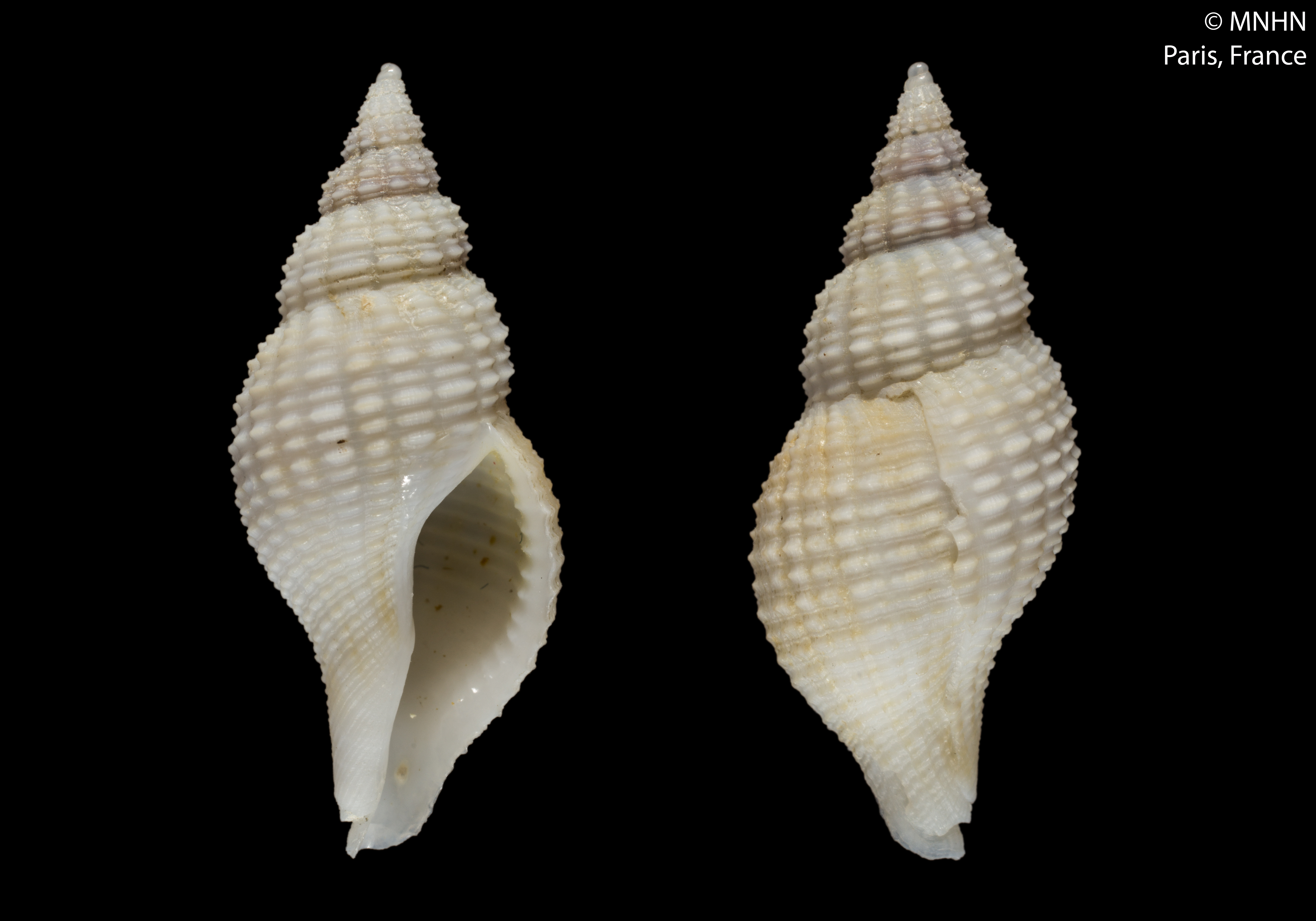
- Shell of Granulifusus balbus (holotype at MNHN, Paris)

Scientific classification
- Kingdom: Animalia
- Phylum: Mollusca
- Class: Gastropoda
- Subclass: Caenogastropoda
- Order: Neogastropoda
- Family: Fasciolariidae
- Genus: Granulifusus
- Species: G. balbus

Binomial name
- Granulifusus balbus Hadorn & Fraussen, 2005

= Granulifusus balbus =

Species of gastropod

Granulifusus balbus is a species of sea snail, a marine gastropod mollusc in the family Fasciolariidae, the spindle snails, the tulip snails and their allies.

== Description ==
The length of the shell attains 28.2 mm.

== Distribution ==
This marine species occurs off New Caledonia. It has been recorded on the continental slope at depths of 30 m to 200 m, but also has been recorded at 550 m.
