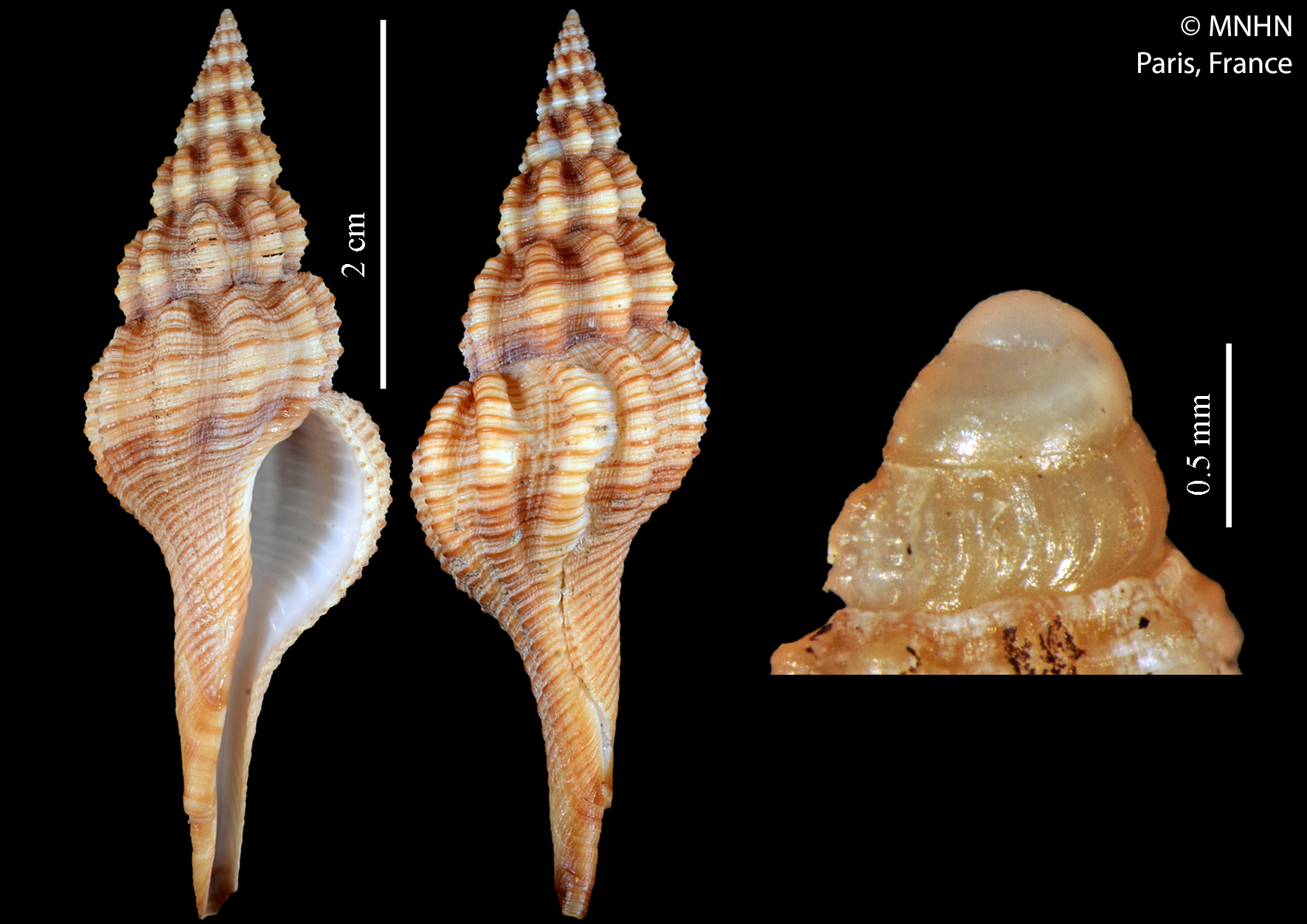
- Shell of Granulifusus annae (holotype at MNHN, Paris)

Scientific classification
- Kingdom: Animalia
- Phylum: Mollusca
- Class: Gastropoda
- Subclass: Caenogastropoda
- Order: Neogastropoda
- Superfamily: Buccinoidea
- Family: Fasciolariidae
- Subfamily: Fusininae
- Genus: Granulifusus; Kuroda & Habe, 1954

Type species
- Fusus niponicus E.A. Smith, 1879

Synonyms
- Simplicifusus Kira, 1972

= Granulifusus =

Genus of gastropods

Granulifusus is a genus of sea snails, marine gastropod mollusks in the subfamily Fusininae of the family Fasciolariidae, the spindle snails, the tulip snails and their allies.

== Species ==
Species within the genus Granulifusus include:

- Granulifusus amoenus Hadorn & Fraussen, 2005
- Granulifusus annae Kantor, Fedosov, Snyder & Bouchet, 2018
- Granulifusus babae Hadorn & Fraussen, 2005
- Granulifusus bacciballus Hadorn & Fraussen, 2005
- Granulifusus balbus Hadorn & Fraussen, 2005
- Granulifusus benjamini Hadorn & Fraussen, 2005
- Granulifusus captivus (Smith, 1889)
- Granulifusus consimilis Garrard, 1966
- Granulifusus dalli (Watson, 1882)
- Granulifusus discrepans (Kuroda & Habe, 1961)
- Granulifusus dondani M.A. Snyder, 2003
- Granulifusus faurei (Barnard, 1959)
- Granulifusus geometricus Hadorn & Fraussen, 2005
- Granulifusus guidoi Kantor, Fedosov, Snyder & Bouchet, 2018
- Granulifusus hayashii Habe, 1961
- Granulifusus jeanpierrevezzaroi (Cossignani, 2017)
- Granulifusus kiranus Shuto, 1958
- Granulifusus kurodai (Okutani & Sakurai, 1964)
- Granulifusus lochi Hadorn & Fraussen, 2005
- Granulifusus martinorum Cernohorsky, 1987
- Granulifusus monsecourorum Hadorn & Fraussen, 2005
- † Granulifusus musasiensis (Makiyama, 1922)
- † Granulifusus nakasiensis Hadorn & Fraussen, 2005
- Granulifusus niponicus (E.A. Smith, 1879)
- Granulifusus noguchii (Habe & Masuda, 1990)
- Granulifusus norfolkensis Kantor, Fedosov, Snyder & Bouchet, 2018
- Granulifusus obesus Snyder, 2013
- Granulifusus poppei Delsaerdt, 1995
- Granulifusus pulchellus Hadorn & Chino, 2005
- Granulifusus rubrolineatus (G.B. Sowerby II, 1870)
- Granulifusus rufinodis (von Martens, 1901)
- Granulifusus staminatus (Garrard, 1966)
- Granulifusus tatianae Kantor, Fedosov, Snyder & Bouchet, 2018
- Granulifusus vermeiji M.A. Snyder, 2003
- Granulifusus westhuizeni Lussi, 2014
- Granulifusus williami (Poppe & Tagaro, 2006)

Species brought into synonymy

- Granulifusus libratus (Watson, 1886): synonym of Granulifusus dalli (Watson, 1882)
- Granulifusus simplex (E.A. Smith, 1879) accepted as "Fusinus pauciliratus complex" Snyder, 2000
- Granulifusus suboblitus (Pilsbry, 1904): synonym of Granulifusus niponicus (E.A. Smith, 1879)
