= Fusolatirus brinkae =

Scientific classification
- Kingdom: Animalia
- Phylum: Mollusca
- Class: Gastropoda
- Subclass: Caenogastropoda
- Order: Neogastropoda
- Family: Fasciolariidae
- Genus: Fusolatirus
- Species: F. brinkae

Binomial name
- Fusolatirus brinkae (Lussi, 1996)

Synonyms
- Latirus brinkae Lussi, 1996 (original combination)

Species of gastropod

Fusolatirus brinkae is a species of sea snail, a marine gastropod mollusc in the family Fasciolariidae, the spindle snails, the tulip snails and their allies.

== Distribution ==
This marine species occurs off Durban, South Africa.
