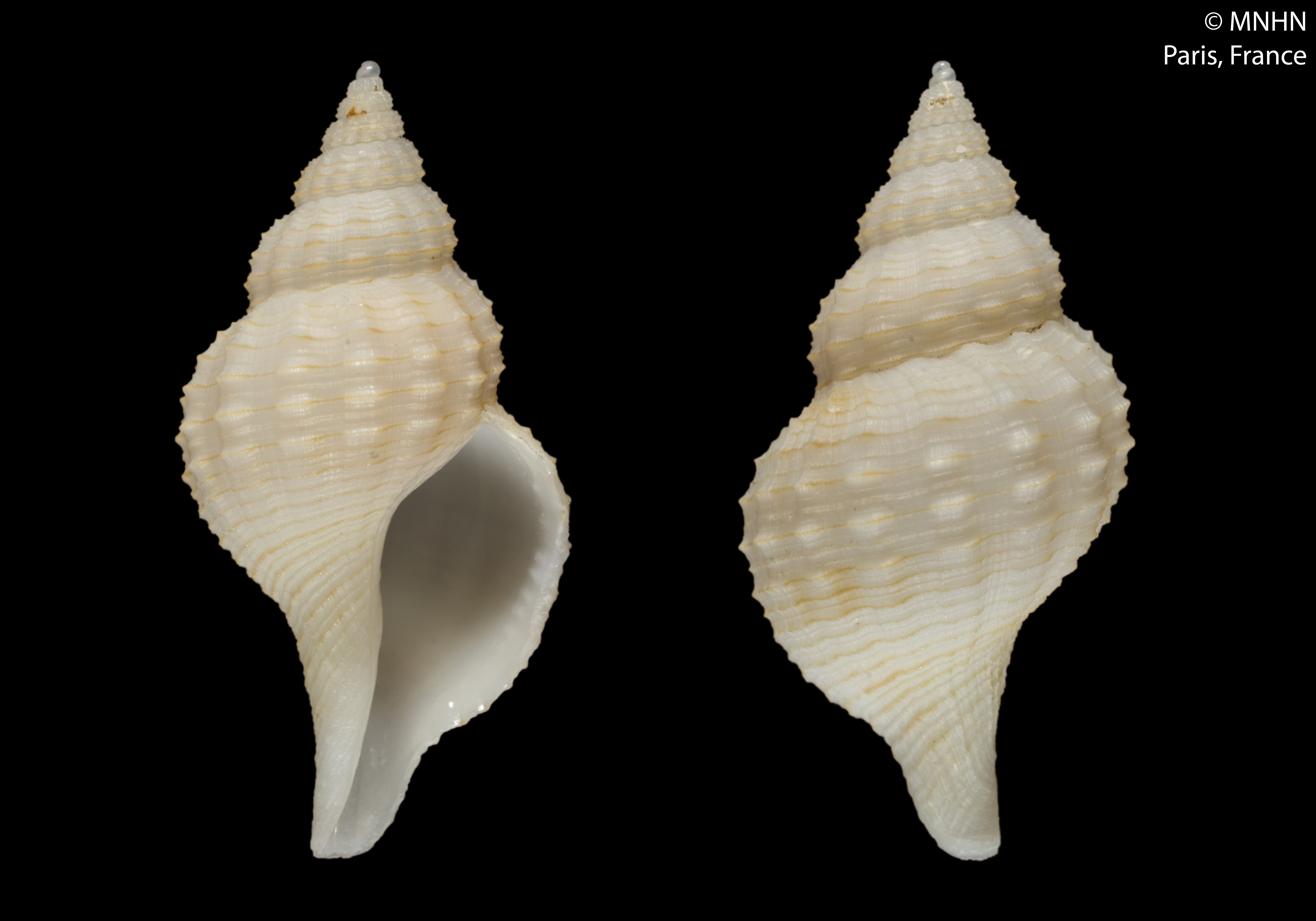
- Shell of Granulifusus bacciballus (holotype at MNHN, Paris)

Scientific classification
- Kingdom: Animalia
- Phylum: Mollusca
- Class: Gastropoda
- Subclass: Caenogastropoda
- Order: Neogastropoda
- Family: Fasciolariidae
- Genus: Granulifusus
- Species: G. bacciballus

Binomial name
- Granulifusus bacciballus Hadorn & Fraussen, 2005

= Granulifusus bacciballus =

Species of gastropod

Granulifusus bacciballus is a species of sea snail, a marine gastropod mollusc in the family Fasciolariidae, the spindle snails, the tulip snails and their allies.

== Description ==
The length of the shell attains 25.8 mm.

== Distribution ==
This marine species occurs off New Caledonia.
