= Granulifusus noguchii =

Scientific classification
- Kingdom: Animalia
- Phylum: Mollusca
- Class: Gastropoda
- Subclass: Caenogastropoda
- Order: Neogastropoda
- Family: Fasciolariidae
- Genus: Granulifusus
- Species: G. noguchii

Binomial name
- Granulifusus noguchii (Habe & Masuda, 1990)

Synonyms
- Simplicifusus noguchii Habe & Masuda, 1990 (basionym)

Species of gastropod

Granulifusus noguchii is a species of sea snail, a marine gastropod mollusc in the family Fasciolariidae, the spindle snails, the tulip snails and their allies.
