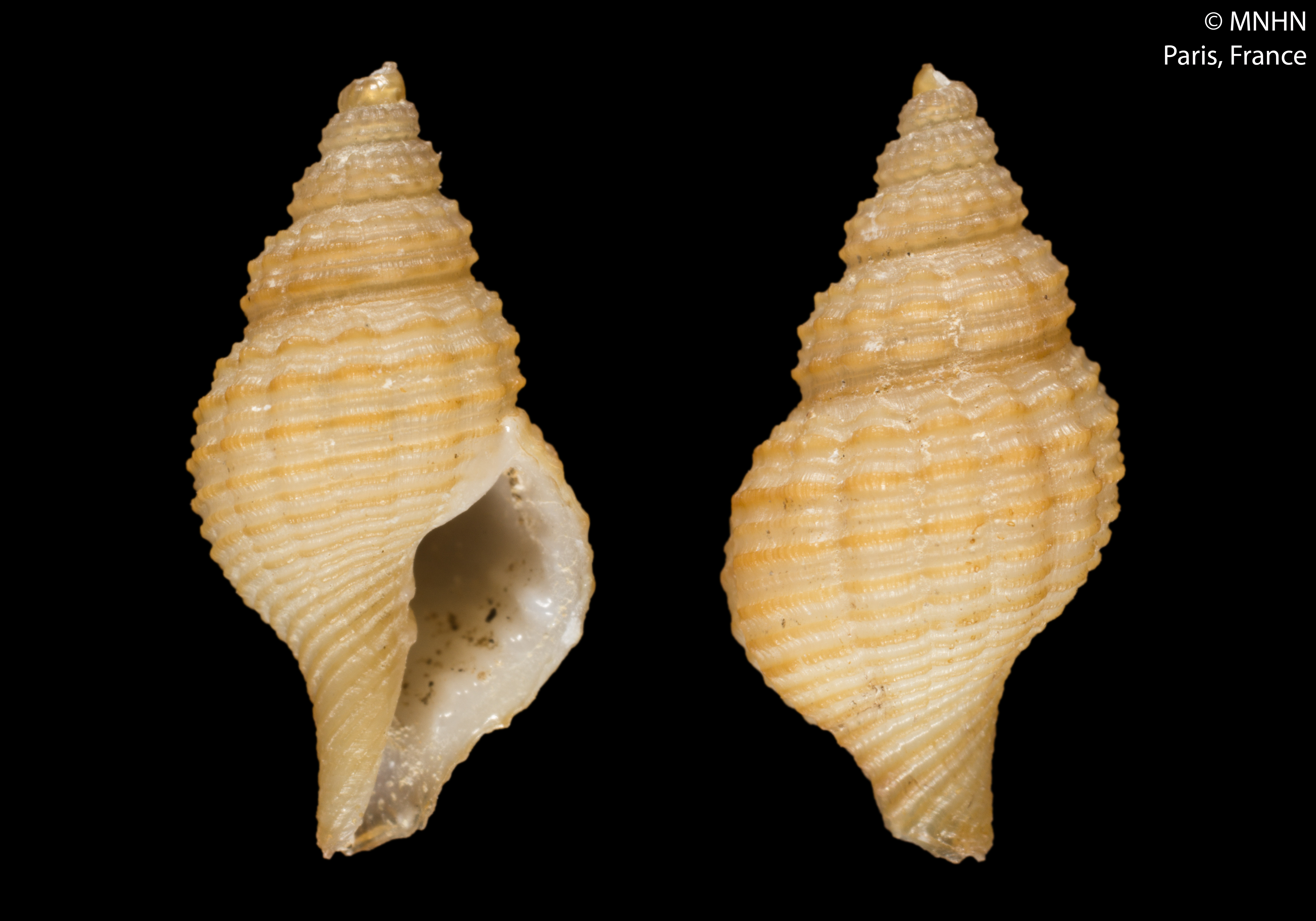
- Shell of Granulifusus amoenus (holotype at MNHN, Paris)

Scientific classification
- Kingdom: Animalia
- Phylum: Mollusca
- Class: Gastropoda
- Subclass: Caenogastropoda
- Order: Neogastropoda
- Family: Fasciolariidae
- Genus: Granulifusus
- Species: G. amoenus

Binomial name
- Granulifusus amoenus Hadorn & Fraussen, 2005

= Granulifusus amoenus =

Species of gastropod

Granulifusus amoenus is a species of sea snail, a marine gastropod mollusc in the family Fasciolariidae, the spindle snails, also known aa the tulip snails, and their allies.

== Description ==
The length of the shell attains 10.8 mm.

== Distribution ==
This marine species occurs off Vanuatu.
