= Fusolatirus formosior =

Scientific classification
- Kingdom: Animalia
- Phylum: Mollusca
- Class: Gastropoda
- Subclass: Caenogastropoda
- Order: Neogastropoda
- Family: Fasciolariidae
- Genus: Fusolatirus
- Species: F. formosior

Binomial name
- Fusolatirus formosior (Melvill, 1891)

Synonyms
- Latirus formosior Melvill, 1891

Species of gastropod

Fusolatirus formosior is a species of sea snail, a marine gastropod mollusk in the family Fasciolariidae, the spindle snails, the tulip snails and their allies.
