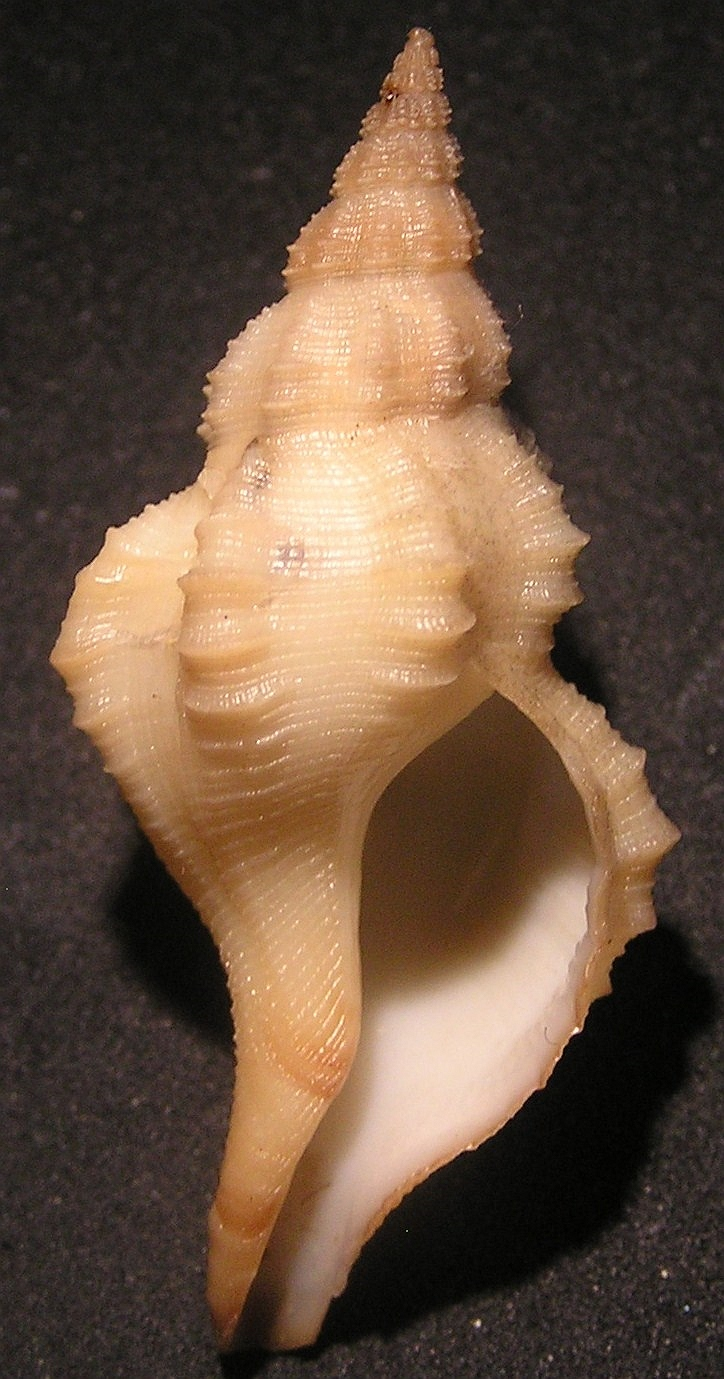

Scientific classification
- Kingdom: Animalia
- Phylum: Mollusca
- Class: Gastropoda
- Subclass: Caenogastropoda
- Order: Neogastropoda
- Family: Fasciolariidae
- Genus: Granulifusus
- Species: G. vermeiji

Binomial name
- Granulifusus vermeiji M.A. Snyder, 2003

= Granulifusus vermeiji =

Species of gastropod

Granulifusus vermeiji is a species of sea snail, a marine gastropod mollusc in the family Fasciolariidae (common name the "tulip snails and spindle snails" and their allies). Its status is "not evaluated" in the IUCN red list.

== Description ==
The shell size is 52 mm.

This snail is a non-broadcast spawner. Its life cycle does not include the trocophore stage.

== Distribution ==
This species has been found at a depth of 100 m (330 ft) at Balut Island, Mindanao at the Philippines.
