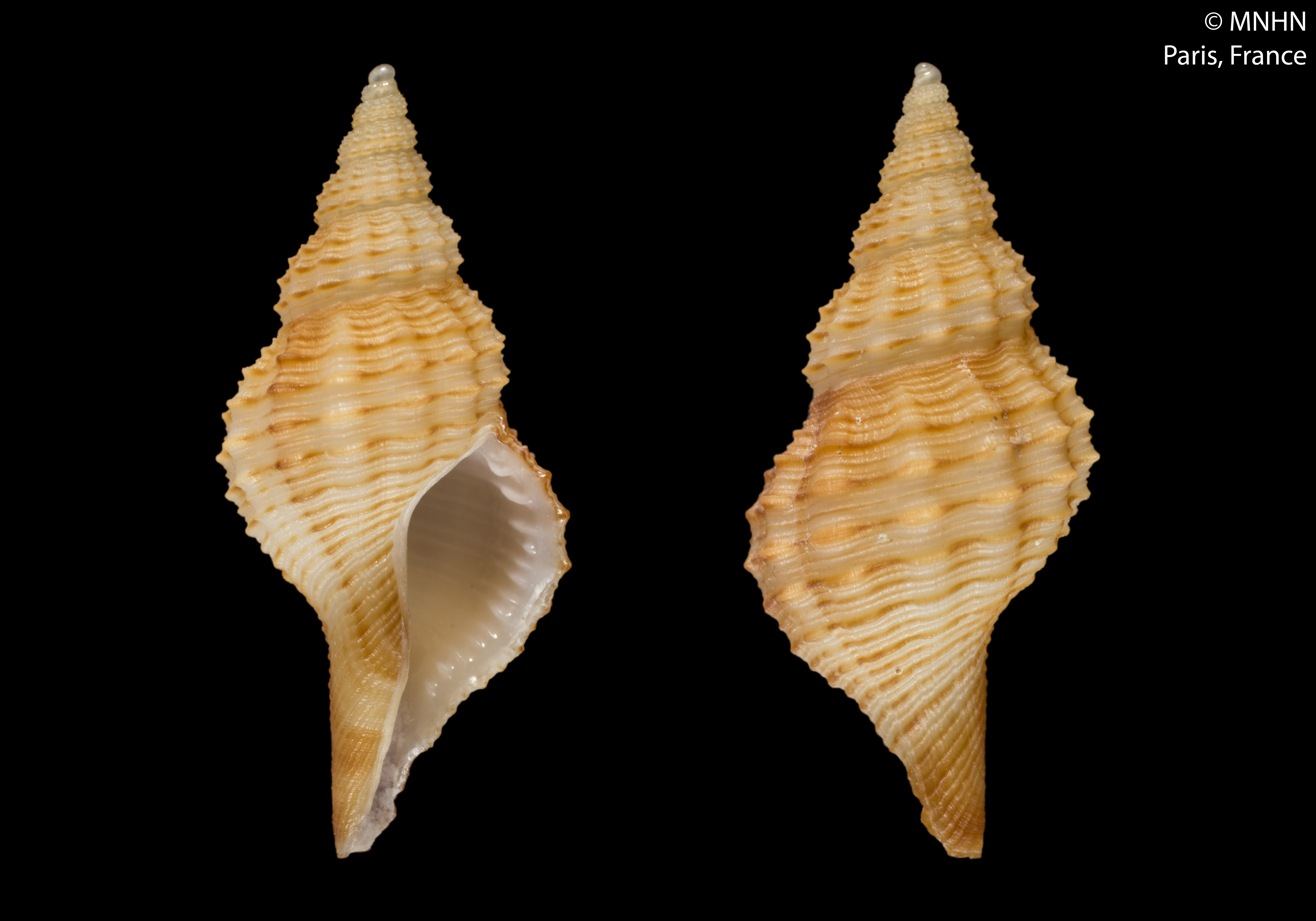
- Shell of Granulifusus benjamini (holotype at MNHN, Paris)

Scientific classification
- Kingdom: Animalia
- Phylum: Mollusca
- Class: Gastropoda
- Subclass: Caenogastropoda
- Order: Neogastropoda
- Family: Fasciolariidae
- Genus: Granulifusus
- Species: G. benjamini

Binomial name
- Granulifusus benjamini Hadorn & Fraussen, 2005

= Granulifusus benjamini =

Species of gastropod

Granulifusus benjamini is a species of sea snail, a marine gastropod mollusk in the family Fasciolariidae, the spindle snails, the tulip snails and their allies.

== Description ==
The length of the shell attains 21.6 mm.

== Distribution ==
This species occurs in the Coral Sea.
