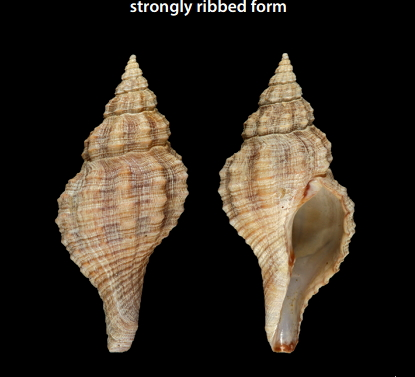
- Shell of Granulifusus rubrolineatus

Scientific classification
- Kingdom: Animalia
- Phylum: Mollusca
- Class: Gastropoda
- Subclass: Caenogastropoda
- Order: Neogastropoda
- Family: Fasciolariidae
- Genus: Granulifusus
- Species: G. rubrolineatus

Binomial name
- Granulifusus rubrolineatus (G.B. Sowerby II, 1870)

Synonyms
- Fusinus rubrolineatus (G. B. Sowerby II, 1870); Fusus rubrolineatus G.B. Sowerby II, 1870

= Granulifusus rubrolineatus =

Species of gastropod

Granulifusus rubrolineatus is a species of sea snail, a marine gastropod mollusc in the family Fasciolariidae, the spindle snails, the tulip snails and their allies.

== Description ==
The length of the shell is rarely more than 40 mm, often less than 30 mm.

The shell is small and broadly spindle-shaped, sculpted with rounded axial ribs crossed by crisp spiral ridges, with fine intermediary spiral threads in between. Shell width and the prominence of axial ribs are variable. The siphonal canal is relatively short, and the inner lip is not strongly calloused.

The colour of the shell ranges from dirty white to pale orange-brown, with reddish-brown spiral ridges. In some specimens, the spaces between the axial ribs are darker brown. The reddish-brown color of the spiral ridges is often interrupted where they cross the axial ribs. The aperture is glossy white. The shell is frequently encrusted with marine organisms, such as zoanthids.

== Distribution ==
These marine snails are endemic to South Africa and have been found off the eastern and southeastern coasts, at depths of mostly between 100 and 200 m, living on substrata of coarse sand.
