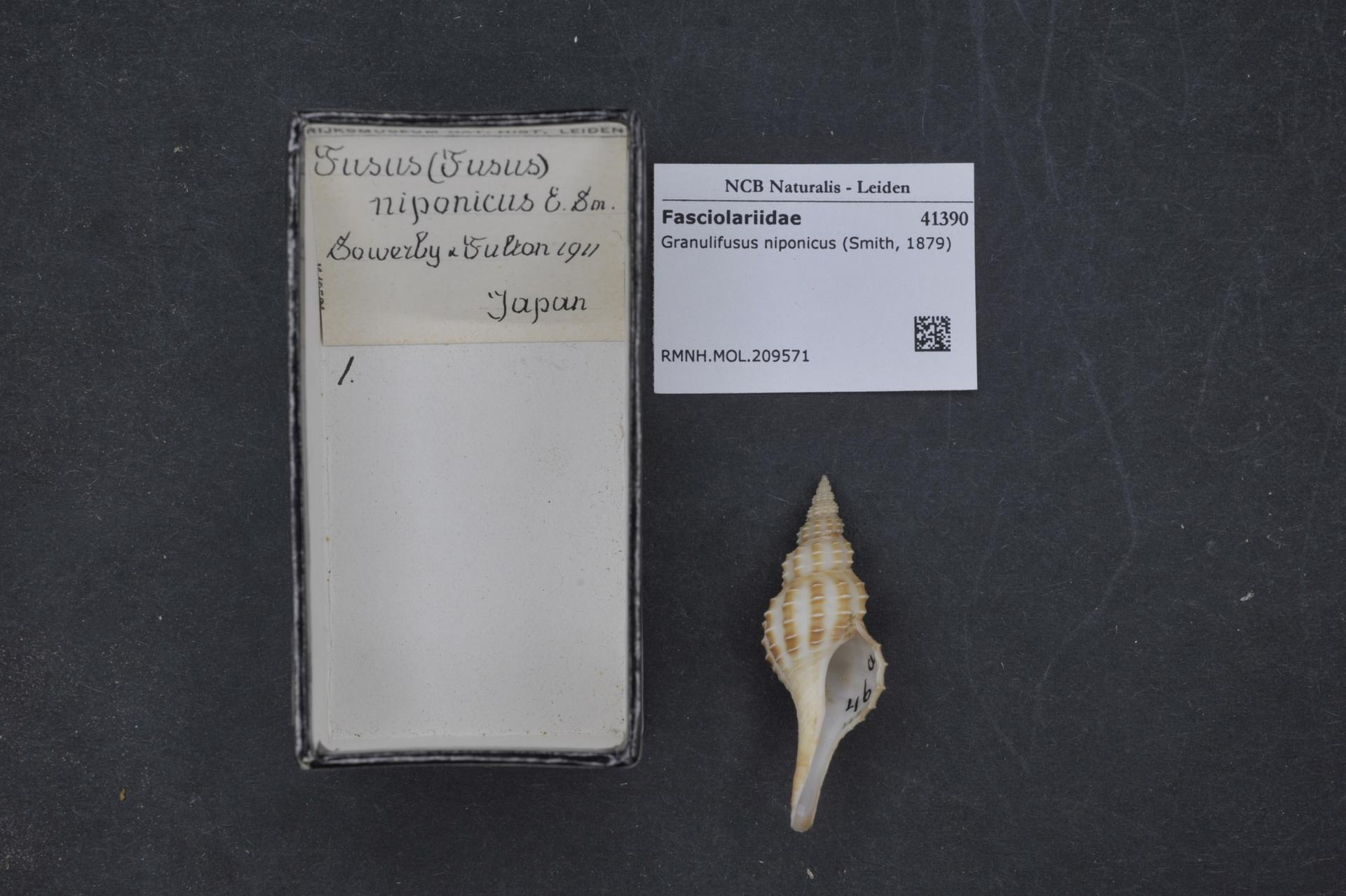

Scientific classification
- Kingdom: Animalia
- Phylum: Mollusca
- Class: Gastropoda
- Subclass: Caenogastropoda
- Order: Neogastropoda
- Family: Fasciolariidae
- Genus: Granulifusus
- Species: G. niponicus

Binomial name
- Granulifusus niponicus (E.A. Smith, 1879)

Synonyms
- Fusinus niponicus (E.A. Smith, 1879); Fusus niponicus E.A. Smith, 1879; Fusus suboblitus Pilsbry, 1904; Granulifusus niponicus suboblitus (Pilsbry, 1904); Granulifusus suboblitus (Pilsbry, 1904)

= Granulifusus niponicus =

Species of gastropod

Granulifusus niponicus is a species of sea snail, a marine gastropod mollusc in the family Fasciolariidae, the spindle snails, the tulip snails and their allies.
