= Fusolatirus elsiae =

Scientific classification
- Kingdom: Animalia
- Phylum: Mollusca
- Class: Gastropoda
- Subclass: Caenogastropoda
- Order: Neogastropoda
- Family: Fasciolariidae
- Genus: Fusolatirus
- Species: F. elsiae

Binomial name
- Fusolatirus elsiae (Kilburn, 1975)

Synonyms
- Latirus elsiae Kilburn, 1975

Species of gastropod

Fusolatirus elsiae is a species of sea snail, a marine gastropod mollusc in the family Fasciolariidae, the spindle snails, the tulip snails and their allies.
