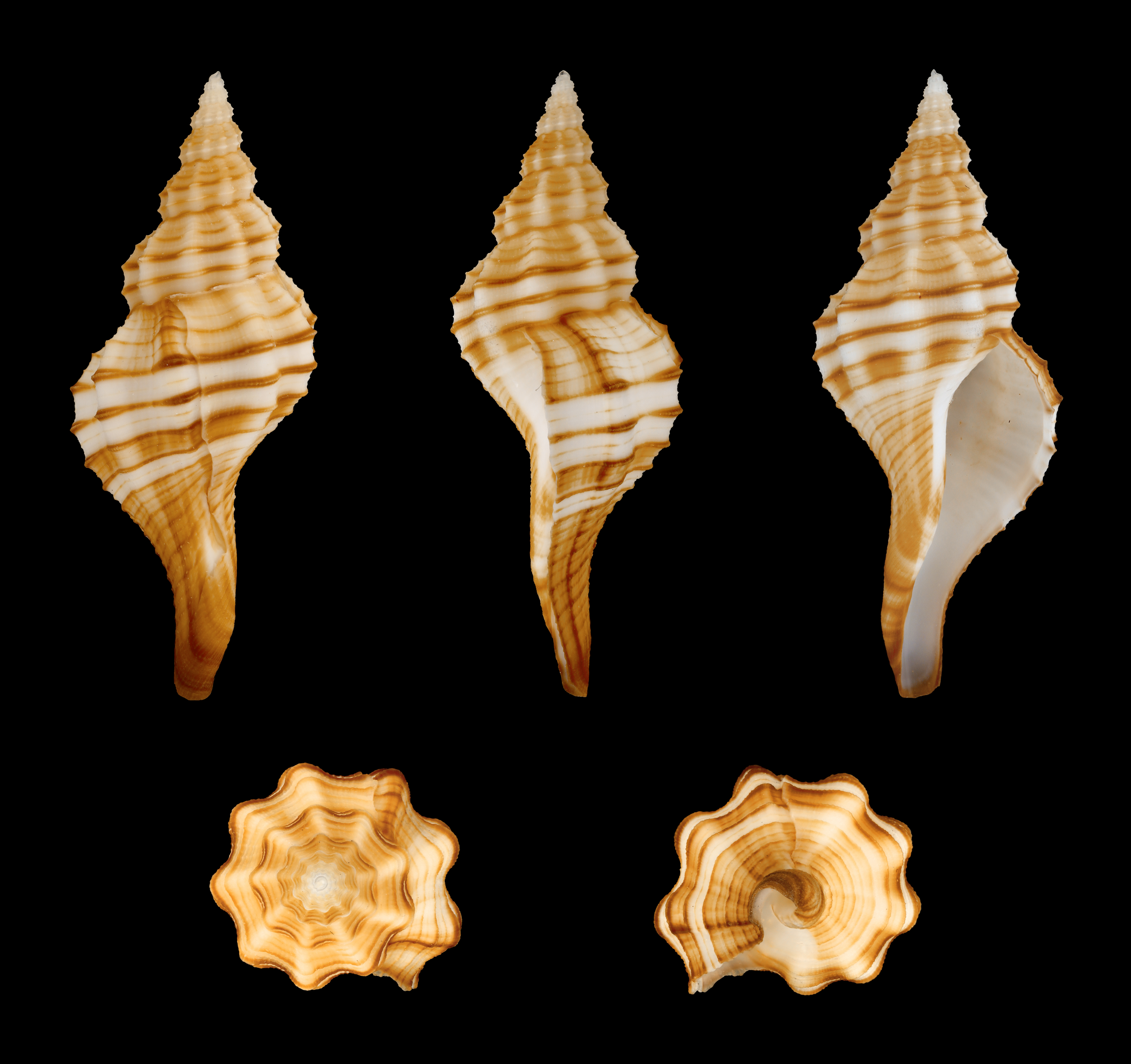

Scientific classification
- Kingdom: Animalia
- Phylum: Mollusca
- Class: Gastropoda
- Subclass: Caenogastropoda
- Order: Neogastropoda
- Family: Fasciolariidae
- Genus: Granulifusus
- Species: G. dondani

Binomial name
- Granulifusus dondani M.A. Snyder, 2003

= Granulifusus dondani =

Species of gastropod

Granulifusus dondani is a species of sea snail, a marine gastropod mollusc in the family Fasciolariidae, the spindle snails, the tulip snails and their allies.

== Description ==
Granulifusus dondani caught in the Philippines were described by M.A. Snyder in The Journal of Conchology, in 2003. These specimens are described as 30 - 50 mm long.

== Distribution ==
Found in the western Central Pacific, near the Philippines.
