= Fusolatirus nana =

Scientific classification
- Kingdom: Animalia
- Phylum: Mollusca
- Class: Gastropoda
- Subclass: Caenogastropoda
- Order: Neogastropoda
- Family: Fasciolariidae
- Genus: Fusolatirus
- Species: F. nana

Binomial name
- Fusolatirus nana (Reeve, 1847)

Synonyms
- Turbinella nana Reeve, 1847

Species of gastropod

Fusolatirus nana is a species of sea snail, a marine gastropod mollusc in the family Fasciolariidae, the spindle snails, the tulip snails and their allies.
