= Granulifusus captivus =

Scientific classification
- Kingdom: Animalia
- Phylum: Mollusca
- Class: Gastropoda
- Subclass: Caenogastropoda
- Order: Neogastropoda
- Family: Fasciolariidae
- Genus: Granulifusus
- Species: G. captivus

Binomial name
- Granulifusus captivus (Smith, 1889)

Synonyms
- Fusus captivus Smith, 1889

Species of gastropod

Granulifusus captivus is a species of sea snail, a marine gastropod mollusc in the family Fasciolariidae, the spindle snails, the tulip snails and their allies.
