= Fusolatirus coreanicus =

Scientific classification
- Kingdom: Animalia
- Phylum: Mollusca
- Class: Gastropoda
- Subclass: Caenogastropoda
- Order: Neogastropoda
- Family: Fasciolariidae
- Genus: Fusolatirus
- Species: F. coreanicus

Binomial name
- Fusolatirus coreanicus (Smith, 1879)

Synonyms
- Fusus coreanicus Smith, 1879; Latirus coreanicus (Smith, 1879)

Species of gastropod

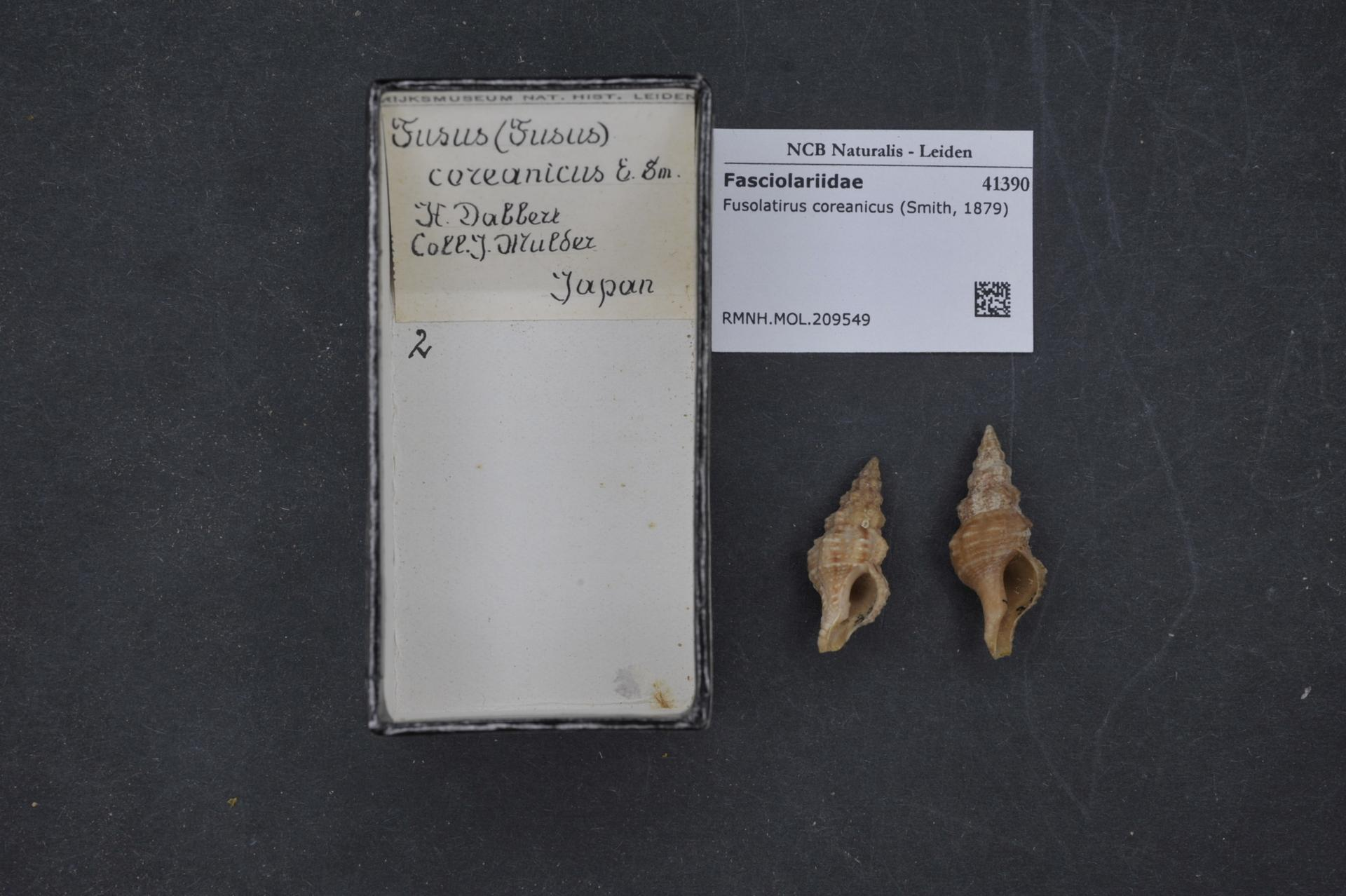

Fusolatirus coreanicus is a species of sea snail, a marine gastropod mollusk in the family Fasciolariidae, the spindle snails, the tulip snails and their allies.
