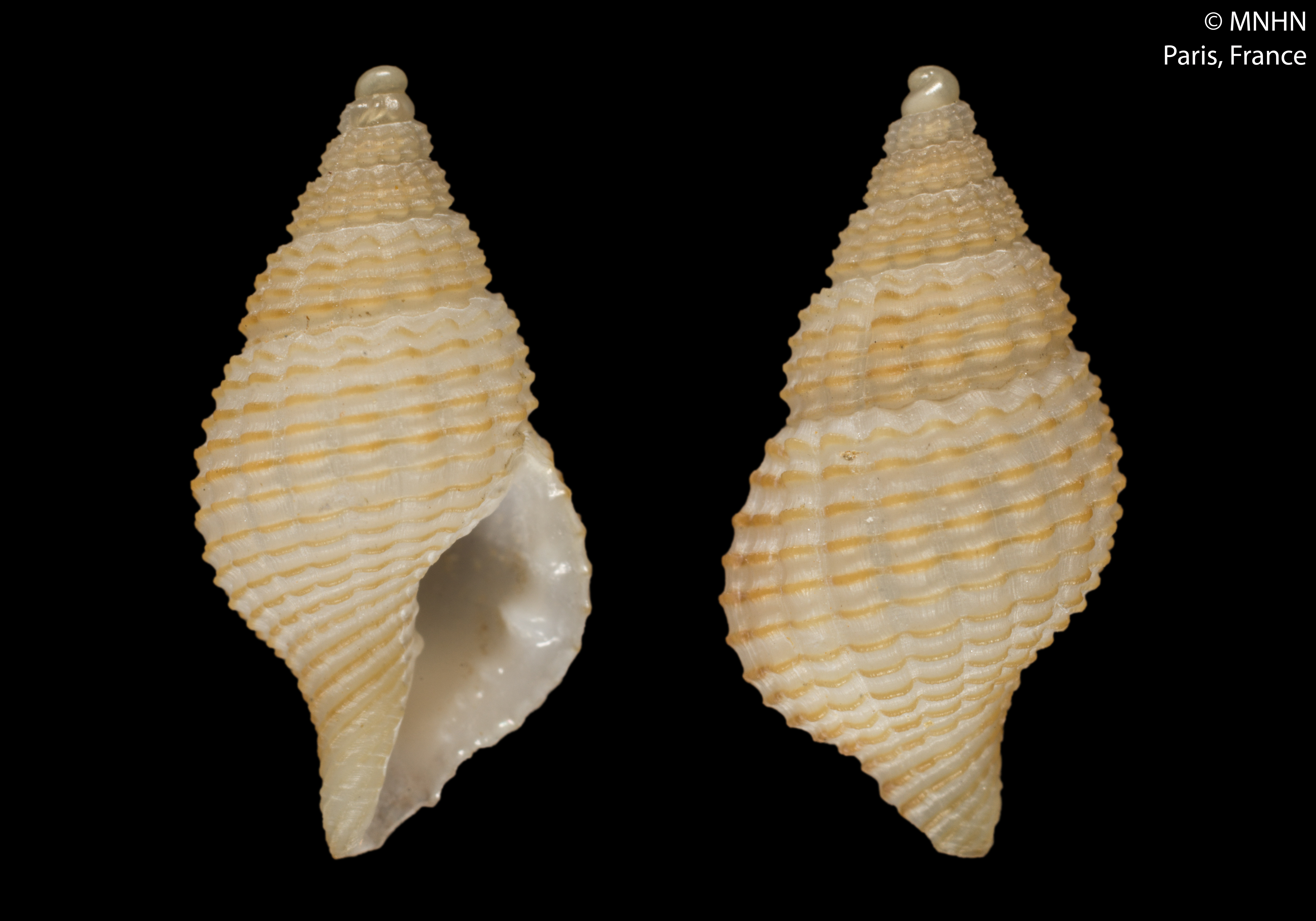
- Shell of Granulifusus geometricus (holotype at MNHN, Paris)

Scientific classification
- Kingdom: Animalia
- Phylum: Mollusca
- Class: Gastropoda
- Subclass: Caenogastropoda
- Order: Neogastropoda
- Family: Fasciolariidae
- Genus: Granulifusus
- Species: G. geometricus

Binomial name
- Granulifusus geometricus Hadorn & Fraussen, 2005

= Granulifusus geometricus =

Species of gastropod

Granulifusus geometricus is a species of sea snail, a marine gastropod mollusc in the family Fasciolariidae, the spindle snails, the tulip snails and their allies.

== Description ==
The length of the shell attains 10.5 mm.

== Distribution ==
This marine species occurs off the Tonga Islands.
