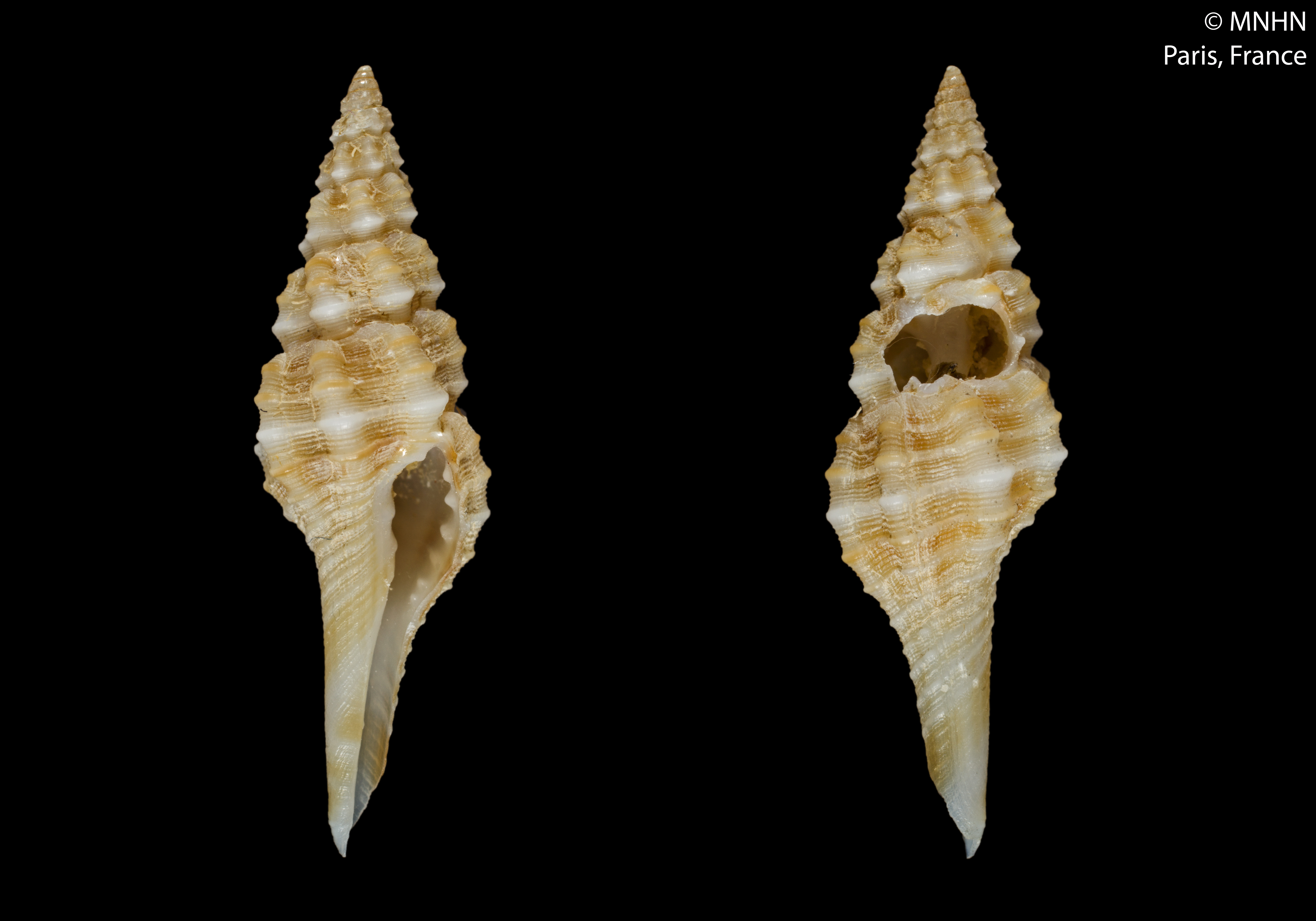
- Shell of Granulifusus williami (specimen at MNHN, Paris)

Scientific classification
- Kingdom: Animalia
- Phylum: Mollusca
- Class: Gastropoda
- Subclass: Caenogastropoda
- Order: Neogastropoda
- Family: Fasciolariidae
- Genus: Granulifusus
- Species: G. williami

Binomial name
- Granulifusus williami (Poppe & Tagaro, 2006)

Synonyms
- Fusinus williami Poppe & Tagaro, 2006 (original combination)

= Granulifusus williami =

Species of gastropod

Granulifusus williami is a species of sea snail, a marine gastropod mollusc in the family Fasciolariidae, the spindle snails, the tulip snails and their allies.

== Distribution ==
This marine species occurs in Indonesia and the Society Islands .
