= Fusolatirus pachyus =

Scientific classification
- Kingdom: Animalia
- Phylum: Mollusca
- Class: Gastropoda
- Subclass: Caenogastropoda
- Order: Neogastropoda
- Family: Fasciolariidae
- Genus: Fusolatirus
- Species: F. pachyus

Binomial name
- Fusolatirus pachyus Snyder & Bouchet, 2006

Species of gastropod

Fusolatirus pachyus is a species of sea snail, a marine gastropod mollusk in the family Fasciolariidae, the spindle snails, the tulip snails and their allies.
