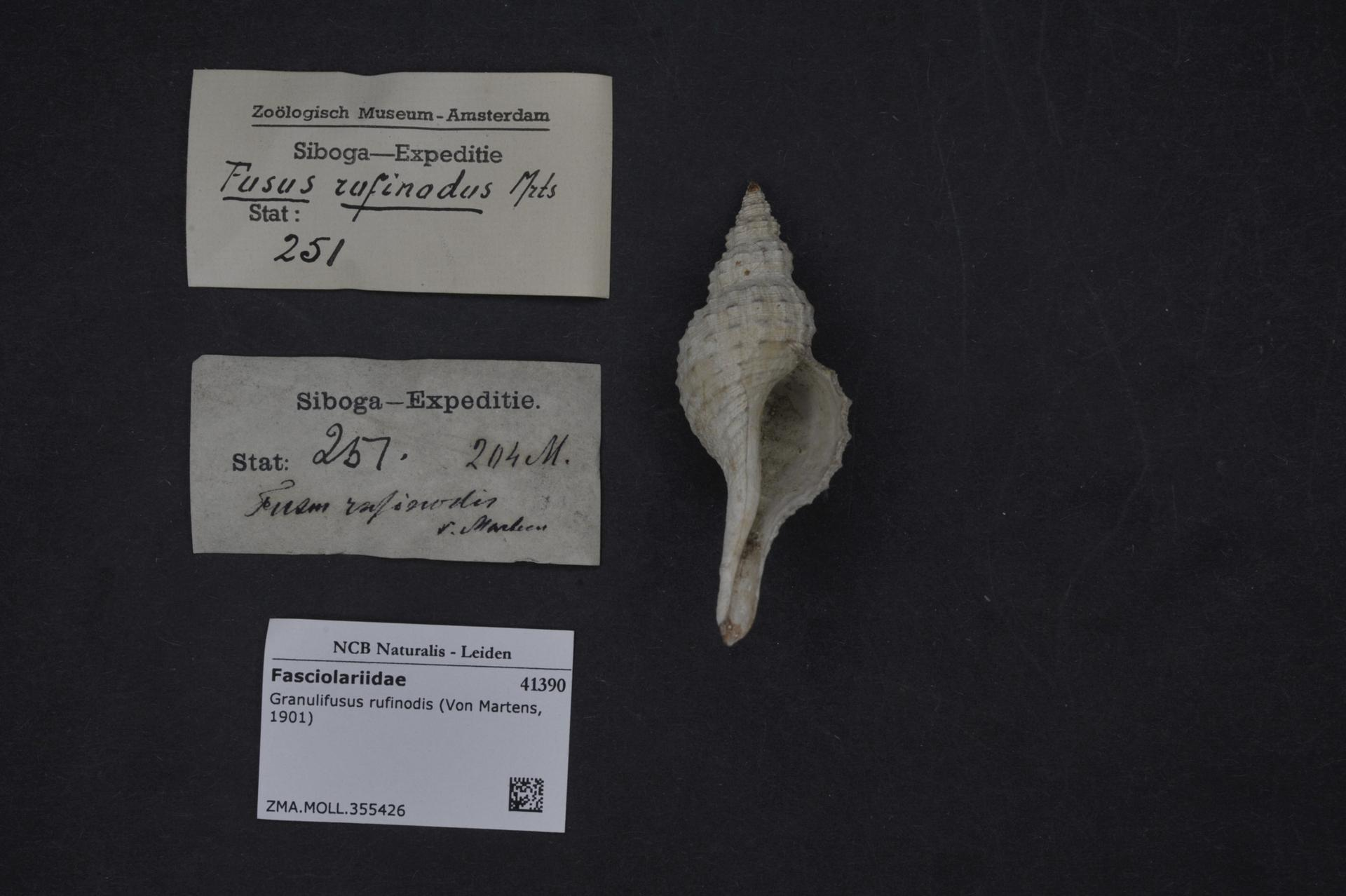

Scientific classification
- Kingdom: Animalia
- Phylum: Mollusca
- Class: Gastropoda
- Subclass: Caenogastropoda
- Order: Neogastropoda
- Family: Fasciolariidae
- Genus: Granulifusus
- Species: G. rufinodis

Binomial name
- Granulifusus rufinodis (von Martens, 1901)

Synonyms
- Fusus rufinodis von Martens, 1901

= Granulifusus rufinodis =

Species of gastropod

Granulifusus rufinodis is a species of sea snail, a marine gastropod mollusc in the family Fasciolariidae, the spindle snails, the tulip snails and their allies.
