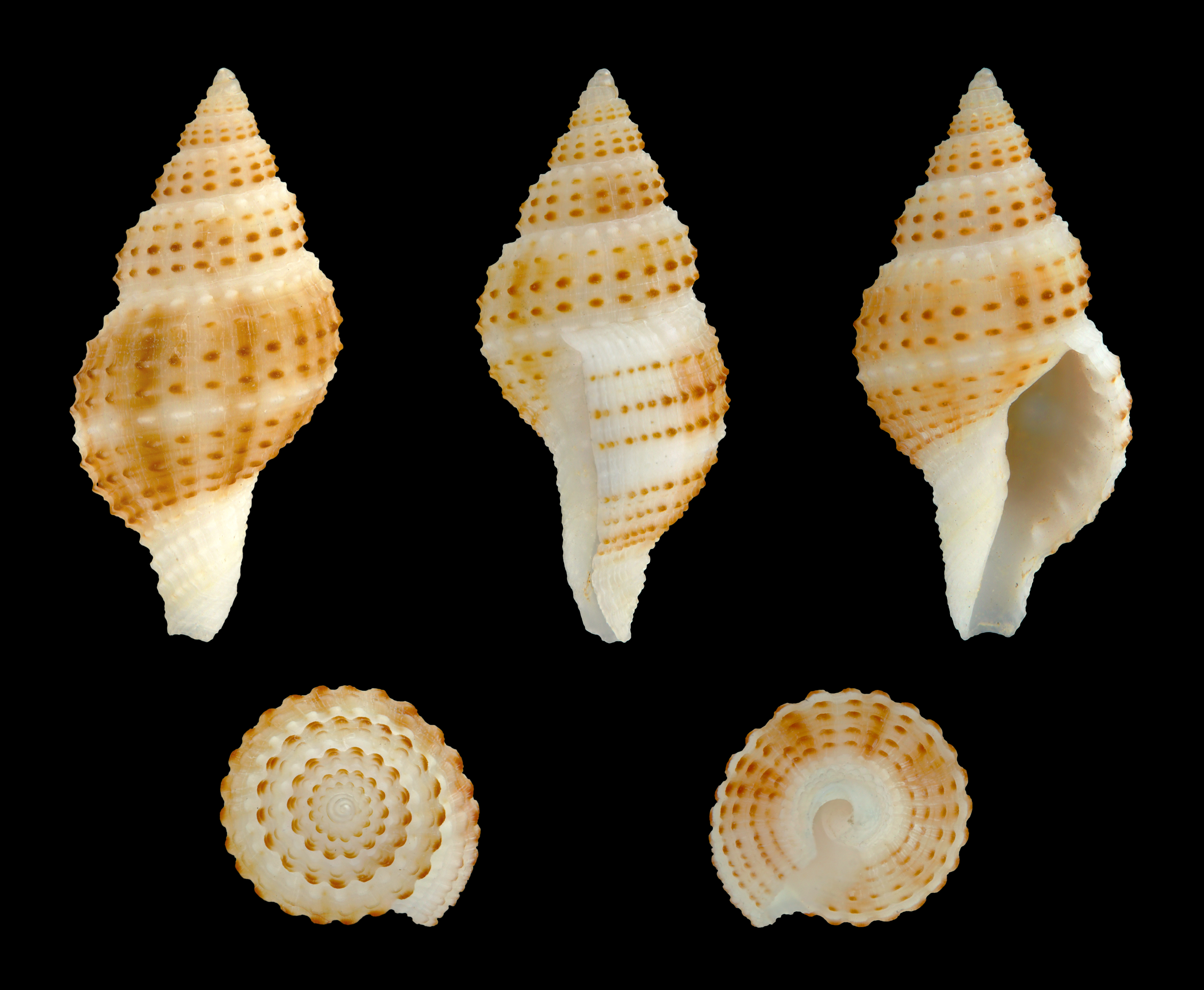
- Five views of a shell of Granulifusus martinorum

Scientific classification
- Kingdom: Animalia
- Phylum: Mollusca
- Class: Gastropoda
- Subclass: Caenogastropoda
- Order: Neogastropoda
- Family: Fasciolariidae
- Genus: Granulifusus
- Species: G. martinorum

Binomial name
- Granulifusus martinorum Cernohorsky, 1987

Synonyms
- Latirus martinorum Cernohorsky, 1987 (original combination)

= Granulifusus martinorum =

Species of gastropod

Granulifusus martinorum is a species of sea snail, a marine gastropod mollusc in the family Fasciolariidae, the spindle snails, the tulip snails and their allies.

== Description ==
The size of an adult shell of this species varies between 14 mm and 20 mm.

== Distribution ==
This marine species occurs off the Philippines.
