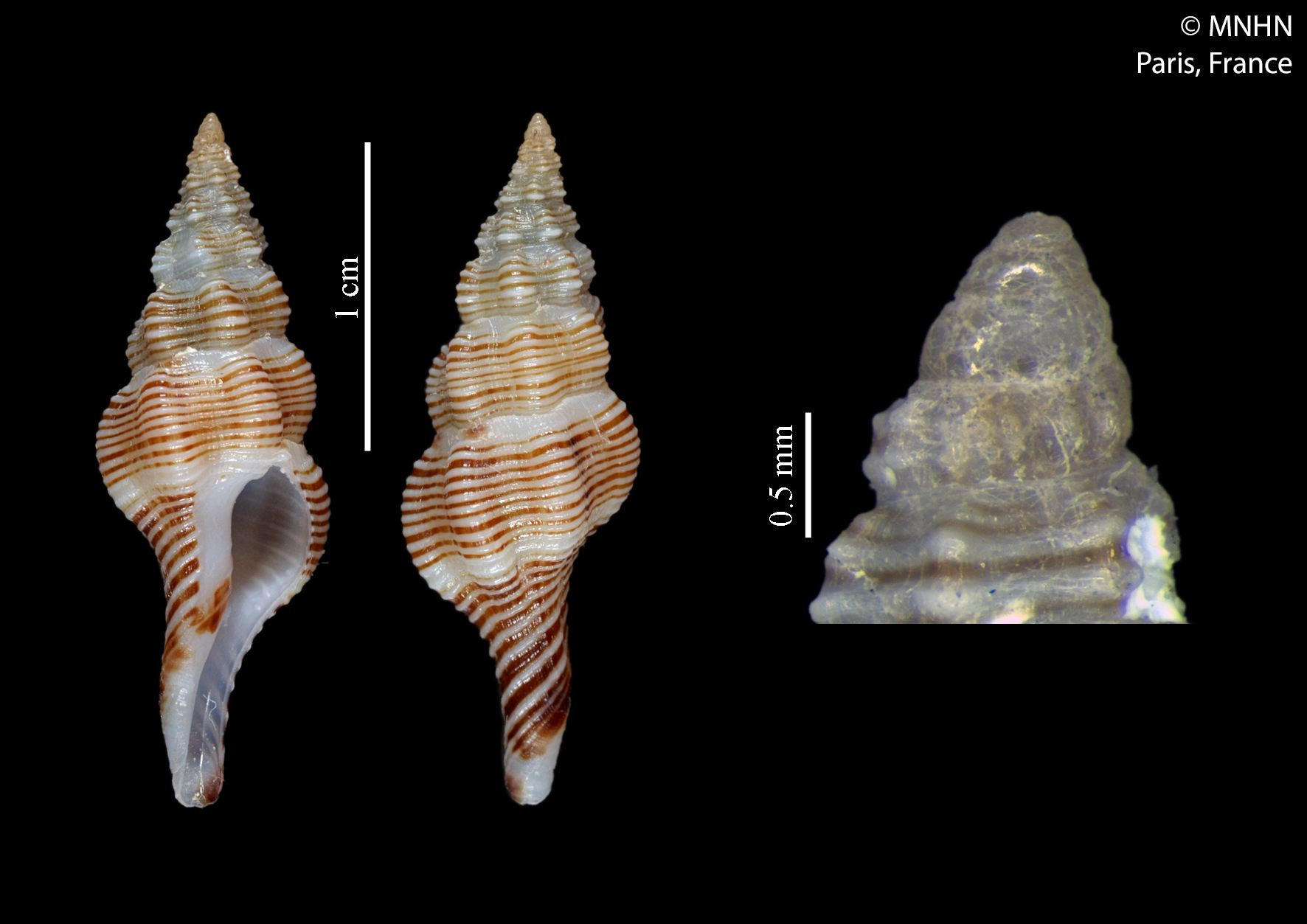
- Shell of Okutanius ellenae (holotype at MNHN, Paris)

Scientific classification
- Kingdom: Animalia
- Phylum: Mollusca
- Class: Gastropoda
- Subclass: Caenogastropoda
- Order: Neogastropoda
- Superfamily: Buccinoidea
- Family: Fasciolariidae
- Genus: Okutanius; Kantor, Fedosov, Snyder & Bouchet, 2018

Type species
- Fusolatirus kuroseanus Okutani, 1975

= Okutanius =

Genus of gastropods

Okutanius is a genus of sea snails, marine gastropod mollusks in the subfamily Fusininae of the family Fasciolariidae, the spindle snails, the tulip snails and their allies.

== Species ==
According to the World Register of Marine Species (WoRMS) the following species with accepted names are included within the genus Okutanius

- Okutanius aikeni (Lussi, 2014)
- Okutanius ellenae Kantor, Fedosov, Snyder & Bouchet, 2018
- Okutanius kuroseanus (Okutani, 1975)
