= Okutanius kuroseanus =

Scientific classification
- Kingdom: Animalia
- Phylum: Mollusca
- Class: Gastropoda
- Subclass: Caenogastropoda
- Order: Neogastropoda
- Superfamily: Buccinoidea
- Family: Fasciolariidae
- Genus: Okutanius
- Species: O. kuroseanus

Binomial name
- Okutanius kuroseanus (Okutani, 1975)

Synonyms
- Fusolatirus kuroseanus Okutani, 1975 (original combination); Pseudolatirus kuroseanus (Okutani, 1975); Pseudolatirus leucostriatus Kosuge, 1979

Species of mollusc

Okutanius kuroseanus is a species of sea snail, a marine gastropod mollusk in the family Fasciolariidae, the spindle snails, the tulip snails and their allies.

== Distribution ==
This marine species occurs off Japan.
