= Granulifusus kurodai =

Scientific classification
- Kingdom: Animalia
- Phylum: Mollusca
- Class: Gastropoda
- Subclass: Caenogastropoda
- Order: Neogastropoda
- Family: Fasciolariidae
- Genus: Granulifusus
- Species: G. kurodai

Binomial name
- Granulifusus kurodai (Okutani & Sakurai, 1964)

Synonyms
- Fusolatirus kurodai (Okutani & Sakurai, 1964); Pseudolatirus kurodai Okutani & Sakurai, 1964

Species of gastropod

Granulifusus kurodai is a species of sea snail, a marine gastropod mollusc in the family Fasciolariidae, the spindle snails, the tulip snails and their allies. This marine species occurs off Japan.

This species reproduces sexually.
