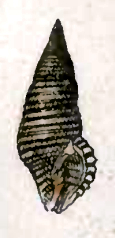
- Teralatirus roboreus

Scientific classification
- Kingdom: Animalia
- Phylum: Mollusca
- Class: Gastropoda
- Subclass: Caenogastropoda
- Order: Neogastropoda
- Family: Dolicholatiridae
- Genus: Teralatirus; Coomans, 1965

= Teralatirus =

Genus of gastropods

Teralatirus is a genus of sea snails, marine gastropod molluscs in the family Dolicholatiridae.

== Species ==
Species within the genus Teralatirus include:

- Teralatirus festivus (Melvill, 1910)
- Teralatirus funebris (Preston, 1907)
- Teralatirus roboreus (Reeve, 1845)

Species brought into synonymy or recombined include:

- Teralatirus cayohuesonicus (Sowerby III, 1878) accepted as Dolicholatirus cayohuesonicus (G. B. Sowerby II, 1878)
- Teralatirus ernesti (Melvill, 1910) accepted as Teralatirus roboreus (Reeve, 1845)
- Teralatirus noumeensis (Crosse, 1870) accepted as Crassicantharus noumeensis (Crosse, 1870)
