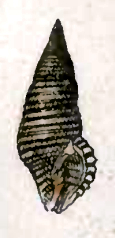
- Drawing of a shell of Teralatirus roboreus

Scientific classification
- Kingdom: Animalia
- Phylum: Mollusca
- Class: Gastropoda
- Subclass: Caenogastropoda
- Order: Neogastropoda
- Family: Dolicholatiridae
- Genus: Teralatirus
- Species: T. roboreus

Binomial name
- Teralatirus roboreus (Reeve, 1845)

Synonyms
- Mitra roborea Reeve, 1845 (original combination); Latirus ernesti Melvill, 1910; Teralatirus ernesti (Melvill, 1910)

= Teralatirus roboreus =

Species of gastropod

Teralatirus roboreus is a species of sea snail, a marine gastropod mollusc in the family Dolicholatiridae.

== Shell ==
Teralatirus roboreus has a small (~10 mm), spindle-like, richly-sculptured, uncompressed shell. Adult specimens usually have seven convex whorls in total, with an inconspicuous suture, and a tall, conical spire that corresponds to 3/4 of the total shell length. The apex bears a large, inflated, dome-like protoconch with two whorls and a characteristic sculpture pattern. It initially has a smooth surface (1/3 whorl), which suddenly becomes ornamented by a series of strong axial ribs. By the second whorl, it gradually changes into a net-like pattern of axial ribs and spiral cords, bearing small nodules at the intersections. This intricate sculpture is absent in the teleoconch whorls, which are solely sculptured by strong, rounded spiral cords. The aperture outline is elliptical, with a thickened peristome and a well-marked callus. The columella bears two strong folds, and the canal is short and curved. The shell is colored light orange to dark-reddish brown, with a usually darker protoconch.

== Distribution ==
This species occurs in the Western Atlantic, from Antigua, Barbados and the Lesser Antilles to Brazil. it is usually found under coral slabs in shallow waters.
