= Dolicholatirus spiceri =

Scientific classification
- Kingdom: Animalia
- Phylum: Mollusca
- Class: Gastropoda
- Subclass: Caenogastropoda
- Order: Neogastropoda
- Family: Dolicholatiridae
- Genus: Dolicholatirus
- Species: D. spiceri

Binomial name
- Dolicholatirus spiceri (Tenison-Woods, 1876)

Synonyms
- Fusus spiceri Tenison-Woods, 1876

Species of gastropod

Dolicholatirus spiceri is a species of sea snail, a marine gastropod mollusk in the family Fasciolariidae, the spindle snails, the tulip snails and their allies. The species is named in honour of William Webb Spicer.
