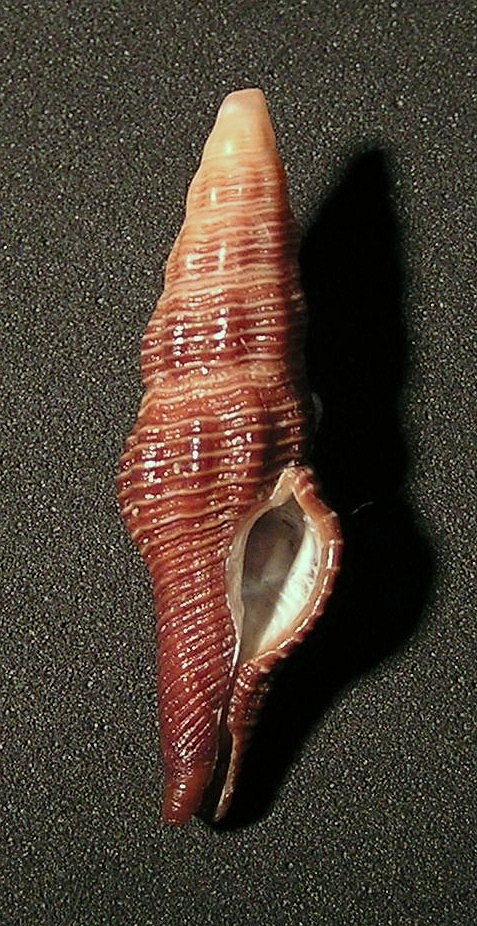
- Apertural view of Dolicholatirus bairstowi

Scientific classification
- Kingdom: Animalia
- Phylum: Mollusca
- Class: Gastropoda
- Subclass: Caenogastropoda
- Order: Neogastropoda
- Family: Dolicholatiridae
- Genus: Dolicholatirus
- Species: D. bairstowi

Binomial name
- Dolicholatirus bairstowi (G.B. Sowerby III, 1886)

Synonyms
- Latirus bairstowi G.B. Sowerby III, 1886

= Dolicholatirus bairstowi =

Species of sea snail

Dolicholatirus bairstowi is a species of sea snail, a marine gastropod mollusk in the family Fasciolariidae, the spindle snails or tulip snails and their allies.

== Description ==
The shell size varies between 18 mm and 37 mm.

== Distribution ==
This species is distributed along KwaZuluNatal, South Africa.
