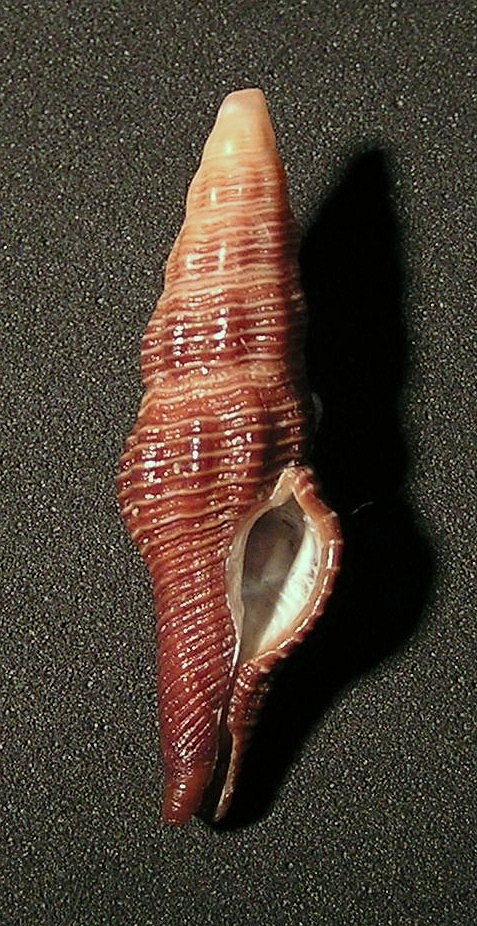
- Apertural view of Dolicholatirus bairstowi

Scientific classification
- Kingdom: Animalia
- Phylum: Mollusca
- Class: Gastropoda
- Subclass: Caenogastropoda
- Order: Neogastropoda
- Superfamily: Buccinoidea
- Family: Dolicholatiridae
- Genus: Dolicholatirus; Bellardi, 1886

Type species
- † Turbinella bronni Michelotti, 1847

Synonyms
- Fusilatirus McGinty, 1955; Latirofusus Cossmann, 1889; Latirus (Dolicholatirus) Bellardi, 1884 (original rank)

= Dolicholatirus =

Genus of gastropods

Dolicholatirus is a genus of sea snails, marine gastropod mollusks in the family Dolicholatiridae.

== Species ==
Species within the genus Dolicholatirus include:

- Dolicholatirus acus (Adams & Reeve, 1848)
- Dolicholatirus bairstowi (G.B. Sowerby III, 1886)
- Dolicholatirus bozzetti Lussi, 1993
- Dolicholatirus brevicaudatus Lussi, 2014
- † Dolicholatirus bronni (Michelotti, 1847)
- Dolicholatirus cayohuesonicus (G.B. Sowerby II, 1878)
- Dolicholatirus celinamarumai Kosuge, 1981
- Dolicholatirus fernandesi Bozzetti, 2002
- Dolicholatirus lancea (Gmelin, 1791)
- Dolicholatirus maryseae D. Monsecour & Lorenz, 2018
- Dolicholatirus minusculus Bozzetti, 2007
- Dolicholatirus mosterti Lussi, 2014
- Dolicholatirus pauli (McGinty, 1955)
- Dolicholatirus smithi Snyder, 2000
- Dolicholatirus spiceri (Tenison-Woods, 1876)
- † Dolicholatirus teschi (Finlay, 1927)
- Dolicholatirus thesaurus (Garrard, 1963)
- Dolicholatirus vezzaroi Cossignani, 2015

Species brought into synonymy

- Dolicholatirus duffyi Petuch, 1992: synonym of Teralatirus funebris (Preston, 1907)
- Dolicholatirus funebris (Preston, 1907): synonym of Teralatirus funebris (Preston, 1907)
- † Dolicholatirus ornatus P. Marshall, 1918: synonym of † Latirogona ornata (P. Marshall, 1918)
