= Dolicholatirus fernandesi =

Scientific classification
- Kingdom: Animalia
- Phylum: Mollusca
- Class: Gastropoda
- Subclass: Caenogastropoda
- Order: Neogastropoda
- Family: Dolicholatiridae
- Genus: Dolicholatirus
- Species: D. fernandesi

Binomial name
- Dolicholatirus fernandesi Bozzetti, 2002

Species of gastropod

Dolicholatirus fernandesi is a species of sea snail, a marine gastropod mollusk in the family Fasciolariidae, the spindle snails, the tulip snails and their allies.
