= Crassicantharus norfolkensis =

Scientific classification
- Kingdom: Animalia
- Phylum: Mollusca
- Class: Gastropoda
- Subclass: Caenogastropoda
- Order: Neogastropoda
- Family: Dolicholatiridae
- Genus: Crassicantharus
- Species: C. norfolkensis

Binomial name
- Crassicantharus norfolkensis Ponder, 1972

Species of gastropod

Crassicantharus norfolkensis is a species of sea snail, a marine gastropod mollusc in the family Dolicholatiridae.
