= Dolicholatirus pauli =

Scientific classification
- Kingdom: Animalia
- Phylum: Mollusca
- Class: Gastropoda
- Subclass: Caenogastropoda
- Order: Neogastropoda
- Family: Dolicholatiridae
- Genus: Dolicholatirus
- Species: D. pauli

Binomial name
- Dolicholatirus pauli (McGinty, 1955)

Synonyms
- Fusilatirus pauli McGinty, 1955

Species of gastropod

Dolicholatirus pauli is a species of sea snail, a marine gastropod mollusk in the family Fasciolariidae, the spindle snails, the tulip snails and their allies.
