= Dolicholatirus lancea =

Scientific classification
- Kingdom: Animalia
- Phylum: Mollusca
- Class: Gastropoda
- Subclass: Caenogastropoda
- Order: Neogastropoda
- Family: Dolicholatiridae
- Genus: Dolicholatirus
- Species: D. lancea

Binomial name
- Dolicholatirus lancea (Gmelin, 1791)

Synonyms
- Murex lancea Gmelin, 1791

Species of gastropod

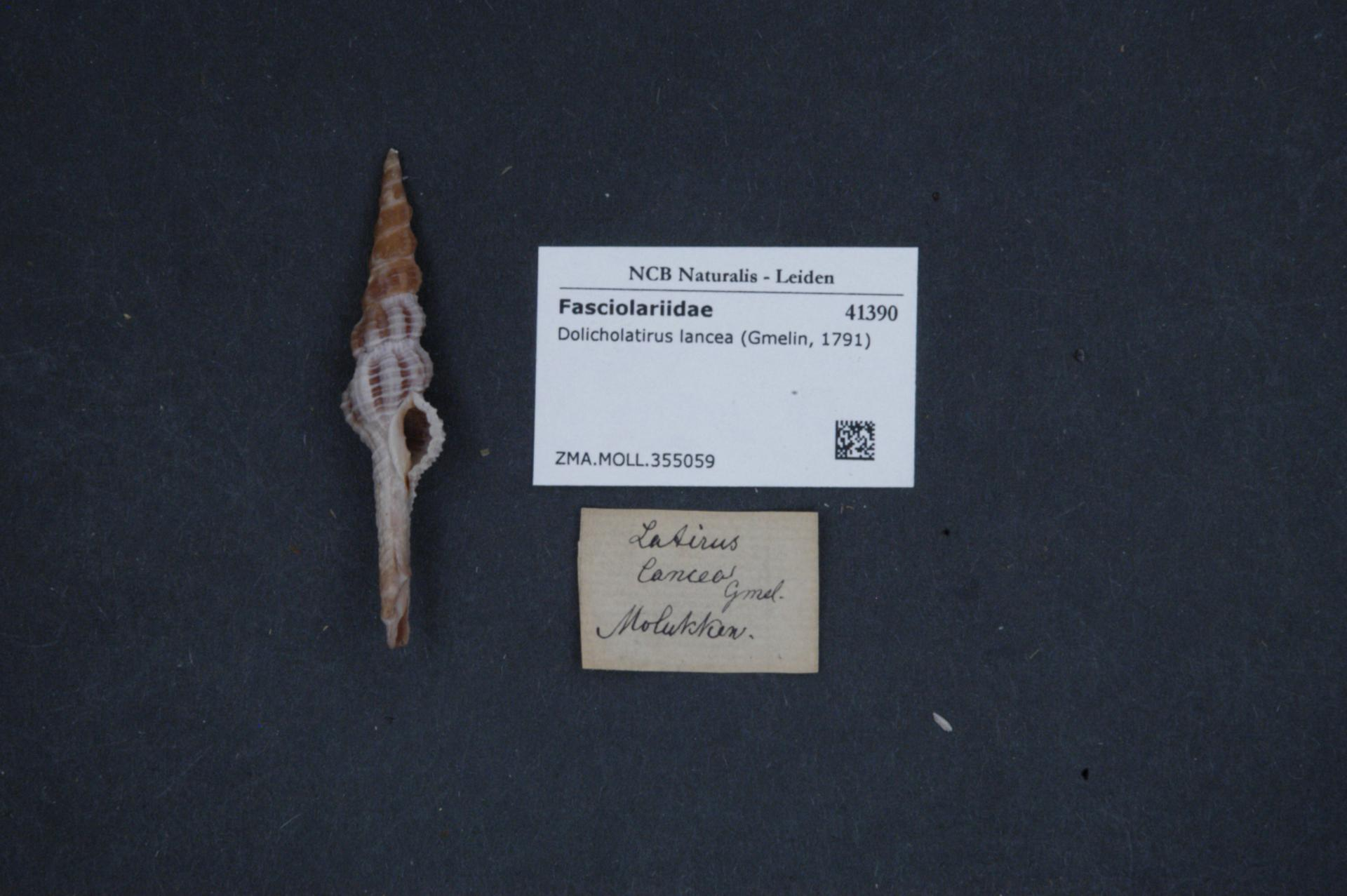

Dolicholatirus lancea is a species of sea snail, a marine gastropod mollusk in the family Fasciolariidae, the spindle snails, the tulip snails and their allies.
