= Teralatirus festivus =

Scientific classification
- Kingdom: Animalia
- Phylum: Mollusca
- Class: Gastropoda
- Subclass: Caenogastropoda
- Order: Neogastropoda
- Family: Dolicholatiridae
- Genus: Teralatirus
- Species: T. festivus

Binomial name
- Teralatirus festivus (Haas, 1941)

Synonyms
- Latirus festivus Haas, 1941 (original combination)

Species of gastropod

Teralatirus festivus is a species of sea snail, a marine gastropod mollusc in the family Dolicholatiridae.
