= Dolicholatirus acus =

Scientific classification
- Kingdom: Animalia
- Phylum: Mollusca
- Class: Gastropoda
- Subclass: Caenogastropoda
- Order: Neogastropoda
- Family: Dolicholatiridae
- Genus: Dolicholatirus
- Species: D. acus

Binomial name
- Dolicholatirus acus (Adams & Reeve, 1848)

Synonyms
- Fusus acus Adams & Reeve, 1848

Species of gastropod

Dolicholatirus acus is a species of sea snail, a marine gastropod mollusk in the family Fasciolariidae, the spindle snails, the tulip snails and their allies.
