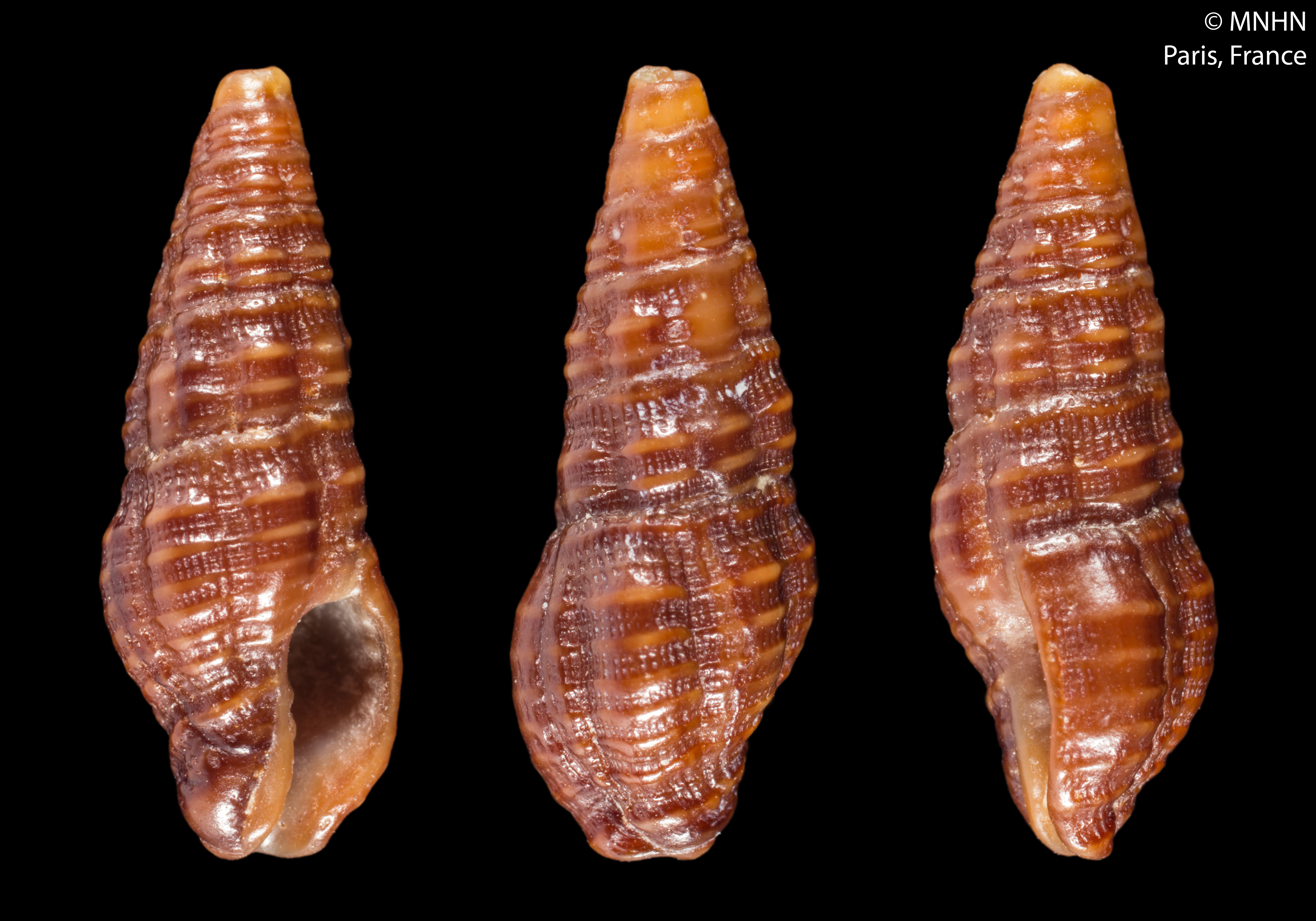
- Shell of Dolicholatirus minusculus (holotype at MNHN, Paris)

Scientific classification
- Kingdom: Animalia
- Phylum: Mollusca
- Class: Gastropoda
- Subclass: Caenogastropoda
- Order: Neogastropoda
- Family: Dolicholatiridae
- Genus: Dolicholatirus
- Species: D. minusculus

Binomial name
- Dolicholatirus minusculus Bozzetti, 2007

= Dolicholatirus minusculus =

Species of gastropod

Dolicholatirus minusculus is a species of sea snail, a marine gastropod mollusc in the family Fasciolariidae, the spindle snails, the tulip snails and their allies.

== Description ==
The length of the shell attains 23.1 mm.

== Distribution ==
This marine species occurs off Madagascar.
