= Dolicholatirus cayohuesonicus =

Teralatirus cayohuesonicus

Scientific classification
- Kingdom: Animalia
- Phylum: Mollusca
- Class: Gastropoda
- Subclass: Caenogastropoda
- Order: Neogastropoda
- Family: Dolicholatiridae
- Genus: Dolicholatirus
- Species: D. cayohuesonicus

Binomial name
- Dolicholatirus cayohuesonicus (Sowerby III, 1879)

Synonyms
- Latirus cayohuesonicus G.B. Sowerby II, 1878 (original combination)

Species of gastropod

Dolicholatirus cayohuesonicus is a species of small sea snail, a marine gastropod mollusk in the family Fasciolariidae, the spindle snails, tulip snails and their allies.
