= William Webb Spicer =

William Webb Spicer (6 September 1820, Esher, Surrey – 28 April 1879, Notting Hill, London) was an Anglican rector and amateur botanist, economic entomologist, and naturalist. He is known for his 1878 book A Handbook of the Plants of Tasmania, which was the first locally printed handbook for Australian flora.

== Biography ==
William Webb Spicer matriculated on 5 December 1838 at Christ Church, Oxford. He graduated there with B.A. in 1843 and M.A. in 1848. In 1846 he was ordained an Anglican priest at the Chapel of Farnham Castle in Surrey, by the Bishop of Winchester Charles Sumner. Spicer married in 1849. From 1850 to 1874 he was the rector at Itchen Abbas, Winchester.

Spicer's interest in botany, and in particular ferns, is recorded in correspondence to Sir William Hooker, the then Director of Kew. ... Spicer's letters written between 1856 and 1857 indicate that he had a personal herbarium. He also visited Kew, and Hooker allowed him to choose specimens from his duplicate collection. Spicer's comments in these letters indicate an understanding of species concepts and plant taxonomic methods.

While living with his wife from February 1874 to March 1878 in Tasmania, Spicer engaged in church duties and philanthropy, gave lectures on natural history, collected plant specimens, and published several research papers, as well as A Handbook of the Plants of Tasmania.

According to a 1878 Nature review of A Handbook of the Plants of Tasmania:

... we have a pocket flora of the colony in which not only the scientific, but, in most cases, also the common or colonial names are given. A short glossary of botanical terms, illustrated by figures, is placed at the beginning of the book, but this includes only such words as it was found absolutely necessary to use in the book. The aim of the author in assisting to popularise a knowledge of Tasmanian plants amongst the colonists will, no doubt, be furthered by the appearance of this little volume.

Spicer was a Fellow of the Royal Microscopical Society. He was also a Fellow of the Royal Society of Tasmania and was elected a Member of the Society's Council in 1877.

== Family ==
William Webb Spicer was the second son of John William Spicer (1789–1862) and Hannah Maria Theresa Webb (1800–1862). On 27 November 1849 in Pirbright, Surrey, W. W. Spicer married Dorothea Halsey (1830–1910). They had four sons and four daughters. In 1870 their daughter Dora Mary Spicer (1852–1923) married Frederick John Simson (1838–1901), whose brother Augustus Simson incurred wounds from a platypus and was the subject of a 1876 paper by W. W. Spicer. Upon his marriage, Frederick Simson changed his surname to Spicer-Simson. In January 1874 Frederick and Dora Spicer-Simson with two children arrived in Hobart, Tasmania. In February 1874 they were joined by William and Dorothea Spicer. Frederick and Dora Spicer-Simson had four sons and six daughters. One of their sons was Geoffrey Spicer-Simson.

== Eponyms ==
- Argentipallium spiceri (F.Muell.) Paul G.Wilson
- Dolicholatirus spiceri

== Selected publications ==
- Spicer, W. W. (1872). "An Entomological Query". Nature. 6 (153): 456. Bibcode:1872Natur...6..456S. doi:10.1038/006456a0. S2CID 4026238.
- ——— (1873). "Etymology of Aphis". Nature. 8 (188): 103. Bibcode:1873Natur...8..103S. doi:10.1038/008103a0. S2CID 2525485.
- ——— (1876). "On the effects of wounds on the human subject inflicted by the spurs of the platypus (Ornithorhynchus anatinus)". Papers and Proceedings of the Royal Society of Tasmania. 12: 162–167.
- ——— (1877). "Conferva bombycina" (PDF). Papers & Proceedings and Report of the Royal Society of Tasmania: 58–61.
- ——— (1877). "Alien plants" (PDF). Papers & Proceedings and Report of the Royal Society of Tasmania: 62–74.
- ——— (1877). "Ergot" (PDF). Papers & Proceedings and Report of the Royal Society of Tasmania: 75–80.
- ——— (1877). "Plants as insect destroyers" (PDF). Papers & Proceedings and Report of the Royal Society of Tasmania: 81–91.
- ——— (1877). "Silk and silk producers" (PDF). Papers & Proceedings and Report of the Royal Society of Tasmania: 101–108.

=== as translator and editor ===
- Nave, Johann (1904). Spicer, W. W. (trans.) & (ed.). The Collector's Handy-book of Algae: Desmids, Fungi, Lichens, Mosses, &c. G. Routledge; translation of Anleitung zum Einsammeln, Präpariren und Untersuchen der Pflanzen mit besonderer Rücksicht auf die Kryptogamen; translation originally published in 1869
  - Nave, Johann (1864). Anleitung zum Einsammeln, Präpariren und Untersuchen der Pflanzen mit besonderer Rücksicht auf die Kryptogamen. Im Anschluss an den Elementarcursus ... der Kryptogamenkunde von ... W. O. Helmert und Dr L. Rabenhorst ... Mit einem Vorwort von Dr L. Rabenhorst. Dresden: Königl. Hofbuchhandlung. Hermann Burdach.
