= Teralatirus funebris =

Scientific classification
- Kingdom: Animalia
- Phylum: Mollusca
- Class: Gastropoda
- Subclass: Caenogastropoda
- Order: Neogastropoda
- Family: Dolicholatiridae
- Genus: Teralatirus
- Species: T. funebris

Binomial name
- Teralatirus funebris (Preston, 1907)

Synonyms
- Dolicholatirus funebris (Preston, 1907); Latirus funebris Preston, 1907

Species of gastropod

Teralatirus funebris is a species of sea snail, a marine gastropod mollusc in the family Dolicholatiridae.
