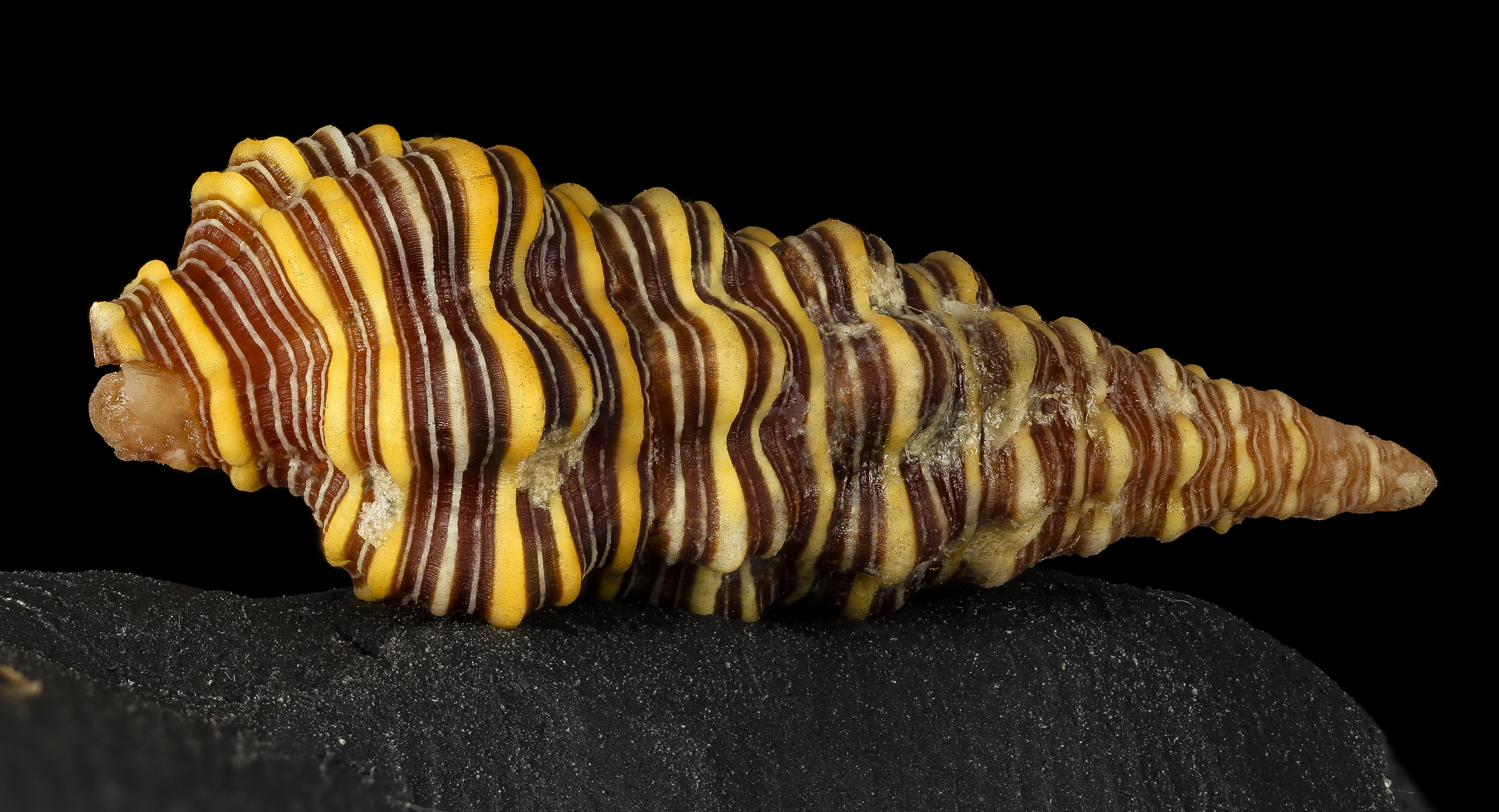
- Crassicantharus noumeensis shell

Scientific classification
- Kingdom: Animalia
- Phylum: Mollusca
- Class: Gastropoda
- Subclass: Caenogastropoda
- Order: Neogastropoda
- Superfamily: Buccinoidea
- Family: Dolicholatiridae
- Genus: Crassicantharus; Ponder, 1972

Type species
- Crassicantharus norfolkensis Ponder, 1972

= Crassicantharus =

Genus of gastropods

Crassicantharus is a genus of sea snails, marine gastropod mollusks in the family Dolicholatiridae.

Snails of this genus are small, and found in the west Pacific.

== Species ==
Species within the genus Crassicantharus include:

- Crassicantharus aureatus Fraussen & Stahlschmidt, 2015
- Crassicantharus beslui Fraussen & Stahlschmidt, 2015
- Crassicantharus boutetorum Fraussen & Stahlschmidt, 2015
- Crassicantharus feoides Fraussen & Stahlschmidt, 2015
- Crassicantharus letourneuxi Fraussen & Stahlschmidt, 2015
- Crassicantharus magnificus Fraussen & Stahlschmidt, 2015
- Crassicantharus metallicus Fraussen & Stahlschmidt, 2015
- Crassicantharus mirabelkarinae Cossignani, 2015
- Crassicantharus nexus Fraussen & Stahlschmidt, 2015
- Crassicantharus norfolkensis Ponder, 1972 - type species of the genus Crassicantharus
- Crassicantharus noumeensis (Crosse, 1870) - Fraussen & Stahlschmidt (2015) classified this species as Turbinella noumeensis Crosse, 1870.
- Crassicantharus perlatus Fraussen & Stahlschmidt, 2015

Similar species:

- Fusus lincolnensis Crosse & Fischer, 1865 also possibly belong to the genus Crassicantharus.
