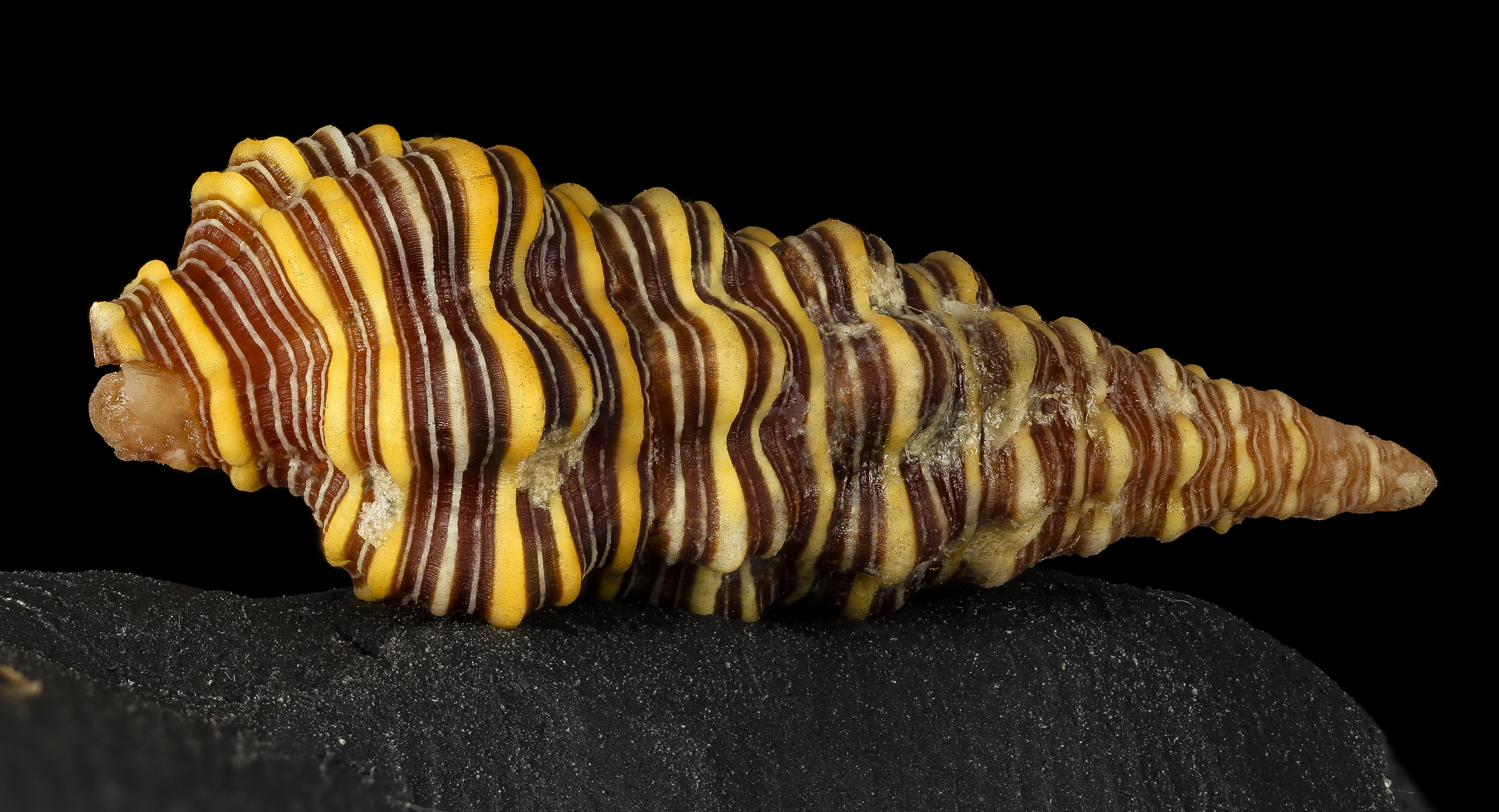
- Crassicantharus noumeensis shell

Scientific classification
- Kingdom: Animalia
- Phylum: Mollusca
- Class: Gastropoda
- Subclass: Caenogastropoda
- Order: Neogastropoda
- Family: Dolicholatiridae
- Genus: Crassicantharus
- Species: C. noumeensis

Binomial name
- Crassicantharus noumeensis (Crosse, 1870)

Synonyms
- Latirus aureocinctus G. B. Sowerby III, 1875; Peristernia aureocincta (G. B. Sowerby III, 1875); Teralatirus noumeensis Crosse, 1870; Turbinella noumeensis Crosse, 1870 (original combination)

= Crassicantharus noumeensis =

Species of gastropod

Crassicantharus noumeensis, common name the gold-banded latirus, is a species of sea snail, a marine gastropod mollusc in the family Dolicholatiridae.

== Description ==
The size of the shell varies between 8 mm and 25 mm.

(Original description in Latin) This ash-gray imperforate, elongate-fusiform shell is longitudinally obtusely ribbed and transversely decussate with prominent wrinkles and granulose lines. Three elegant orange bands adorn the shell: the first is subsutural, the second and third supramedian and nearly contiguous. The spire is elevated with a scarcely visible suture. Eight to nine convex whorls are present, the first two sub-smooth and pinkish-brown. The body whorl, slightly smaller than the spire, features six orange bands: the fourth and fifth below the middle, and the sixth, basal, originating from the columella and ending in a very short, abruptly interrupted siphonal canal. The ovate aperture is internally purplish-brown at the suture. The simple, purplish-brown peristome has a strongly biplicate columellar margin and a subarcuate, subacute outer margin.

== Distribution ==
This marine species occurs in the Eastern Indian Ocean; off Hawaii, Japan, Mauritius, New Caledonia, Oceania, Philippines and Australia (Western Australia)
