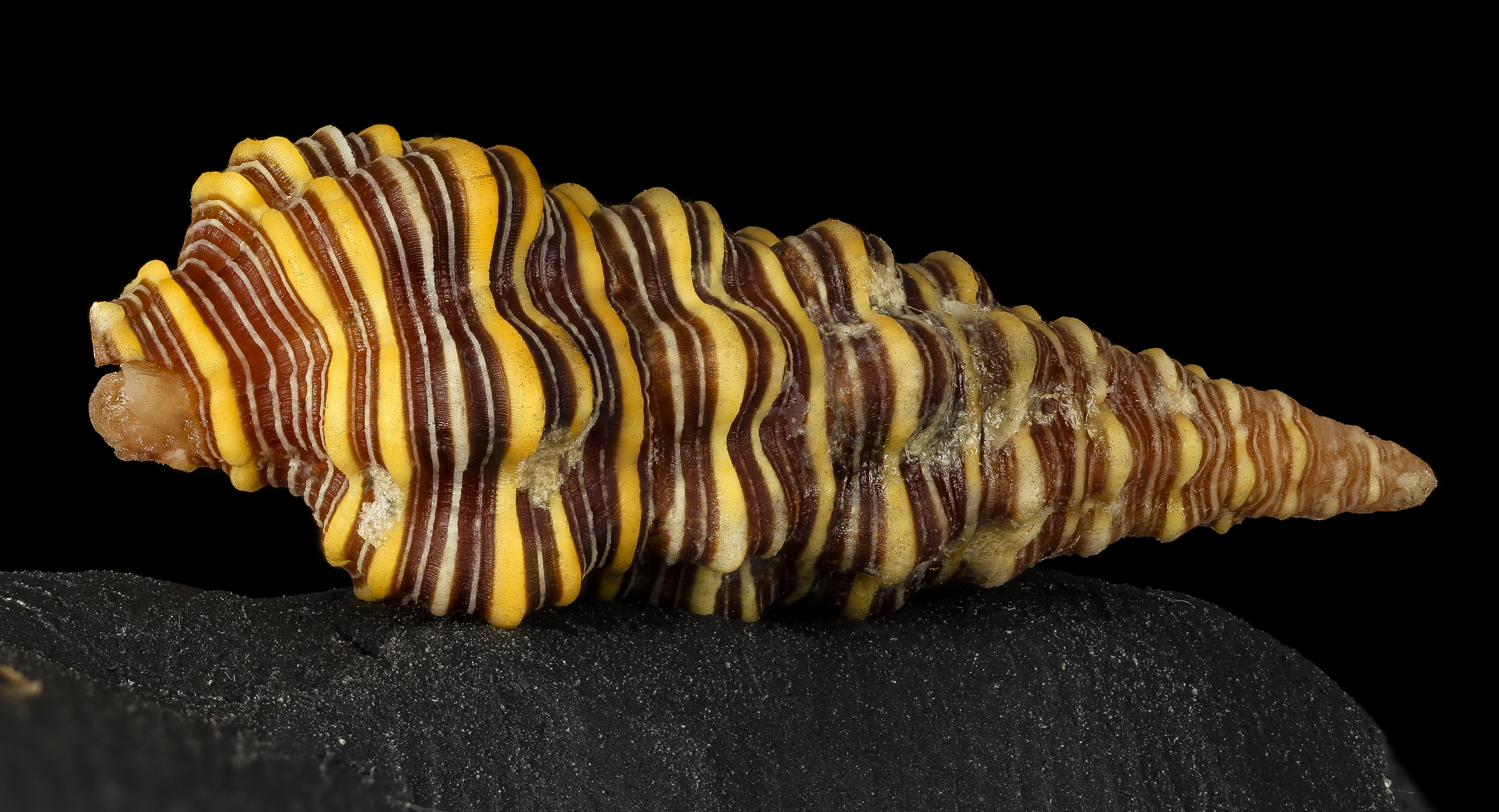
- Crassicantharus noumeensis shell

Scientific classification
- Kingdom: Animalia
- Phylum: Mollusca
- Class: Gastropoda
- Subclass: Caenogastropoda
- Order: Neogastropoda
- Superfamily: Buccinoidea
- Family: Dolicholatiridae; Kantor et al., 2021

= Dolicholatiridae =

Family of gastropods

The Dolicholatiridae are a family of medium-sized sea snails, marine gastropod mollusks in the superfamily Buccinoidea.

They are found from the lower intertidal to lower bathypelagic zones of the tropical Pacific and Atlantic oceans.

== Genera ==
- Crassicantharus Ponder, 1972
- Dolicholatirus Bellardi, 1884
- Teralatirus Coomans, 1965

Synonyms

- † Dolicholathyrus Cossmann, 1901: synonym of Dolicholatirus Bellardi, 1884 (unjustified emendation)
- Fusilatirus T. L. McGinty, 1955: synonym of Dolicholatirus Bellardi, 1884 (synonym of Dolicholatirus)
- †Latirofusus Cossmann, 1889: synonym of Dolicholatirus Bellardi, 1884
