= Bonellitia =

Scientific classification
- Kingdom: Animalia
- Phylum: Mollusca
- Class: Gastropoda
- Subclass: Caenogastropoda
- Order: Neogastropoda
- Family: Cancellariidae
- Genus: Bonellitia; Jousseaume, 1887

Genus of gastropods

Bonellitia is a genus of sea snails, marine gastropod mollusks in the family Cancellariidae, the nutmeg snails.

== Species ==
Species within the genus Bonellitia include:

- Bonellitia scobina (Hedley & Petterd, 1906)

Species brought into synonymy

- Bonellitia afra (Petit & Harasewych, 2000): synonym of Admetula afra Petit & Harasewych, 2000
- Bonellitia atopodonta (Petit & Harasewych, 1986): synonym of Admetula atopodonta (Petit & Harasewych, 1986)
- Bonellitia bayeri (Petit, 1976): synonym of Admetula bayeri Petit, 1976
- Bonellitia cornidei (Altimira, 1978): synonym of Admetula cornidei (Altimira, 1978)
- Bonellitia epula (Petit & Harasewych, 1991): synonym of Admetula epula Petit & Harasewych, 1991
- Bonellitia garrardi (Petit, 1974): synonym of Admetula garrardi Petit, 1974
- Bonellitia gittenbergeri Verhecken, 2002: synonym of Admetula gittenbergeri (Verhecken, 2002)
- Bonellitia superstes Finlay, 1930: synonym of Admetula superstes (Finlay, 1930)
- Bonellitia vossi (Petit, 1976): synonym of Admetula vossi Petit, 1976
