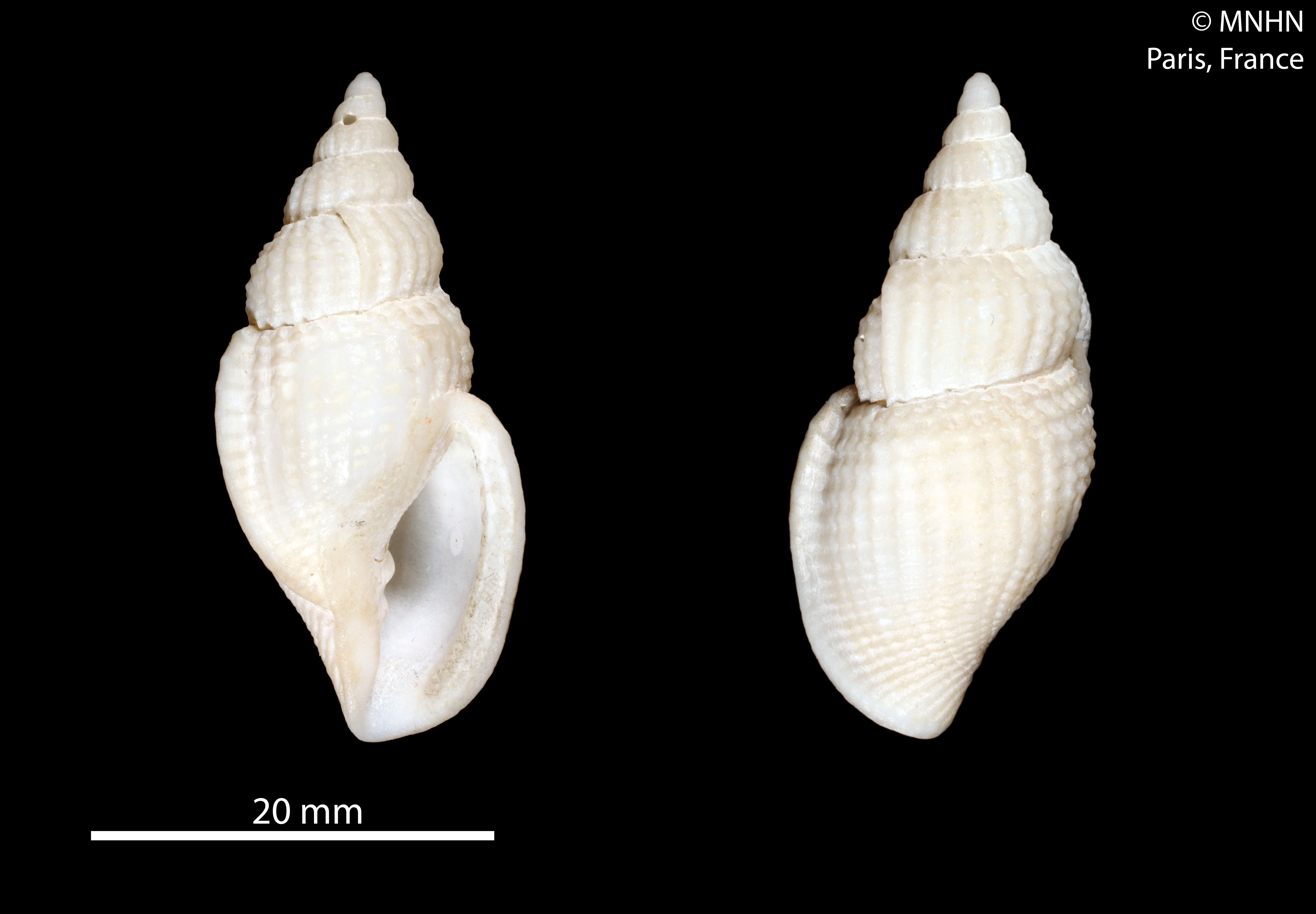
- Mericella bozzettii

Scientific classification
- Kingdom: Animalia
- Phylum: Mollusca
- Class: Gastropoda
- Subclass: Caenogastropoda
- Order: Neogastropoda
- Superfamily: Volutoidea
- Family: Cancellariidae
- Genus: Mericella; Thiele, 1929

Type species
- Cancellaria jucunda Thiele, 1925

Synonyms
- Cancellaria (Mericella) Thiele, 1929 (original rank)

= Mericella =

Genus of molluscs

Mericella is a genus of sea snails, marine gastropod mollusks in the family Cancellariidae, the nutmeg snails.

== Species ==
Species within the genus Mericella include:

- Mericella alvesi (Lima, Barros & Petit, 2007)
- Mericella bozzettii Petit & Harasewych, 1993
- Mericella jucunda (Thiele, 1925)
- Mericella paschalis (Thiele, 1925)
- Mericella rosadoi Verhecken, 2020
- Mericella zhangsupingae S.-Q. Zhang & P. Wei, 2018

Species brought into synonymy

- Mericella cingulata (Olsson & Bayer, 1972): synonym of Gerdiella cingulata Olsson & Bayer, 1973
- Mericella corbicula (Dall, 1908): synonym of Gerdiella corbicula (Dall, 1908)
- Mericella gerda Olsson & Bayer, 1972: synonym of Gerdiella gerda Olsson & Bayer, 1973
- Mericella santa Olsson & Bayer, 1972: synonym of Gerdiella santa Olsson & Bayer, 1973
