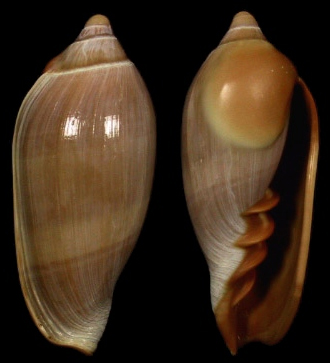
- The shell of a specimen of Afrivoluta pringlei trawled off Cape Agulhas, South Africa

Scientific classification
- Kingdom: Animalia
- Phylum: Mollusca
- Class: Gastropoda
- Subclass: Caenogastropoda
- Order: Neogastropoda
- Superfamily: Volutoidea
- Family: Marginellonidae
- Genus: Afrivoluta; Tomlin, 1947

Type species
- Afrivoluta pringlei Tomlin, 1947

= Afrivoluta =

Genus of gastropods

Afrivoluta is a genus of large deepwater sea snails with glossy shells, marine gastropod molluscs in the family Marginellonidae.

== Species ==
Species within the genus Afrivoluta include:

- Afrivoluta pringlei Tomlin, 1947
