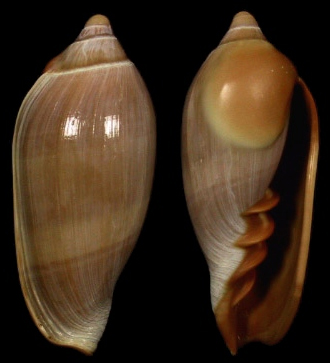
- The shell of a specimen of Afrivoluta pringlei trawled off Cape Agulhas, South Africa

Scientific classification
- Kingdom: Animalia
- Phylum: Mollusca
- Class: Gastropoda
- Subclass: Caenogastropoda
- Order: Neogastropoda
- Family: Marginellonidae
- Genus: Afrivoluta
- Species: A. pringlei

Binomial name
- Afrivoluta pringlei Tomlin, 1947

= Afrivoluta pringlei =

Species of gastropod

Afrivoluta pringlei, commonly known as the pringle's marginella, is a species of large deep water sea snail with a glossy shell, a marine gastropod mollusc in the family Marginellonidae.

Tomlin called the genus Afrivoluta, and the genotype pringlei, after the director of the Port Elizabeth Museum and Snake Park.

== Description ==
The length of the shell attains 120 mm.

The shell is large and volute-like, with an oblong body whorl and a bluntly rounded apex. A well-developed, oval callus deposit is present near the parietal region. The surface is smooth and glossy. The aperture is narrow and elongated, with the basal half of the inner lip featuring four strong, oblique pleats. The outer lip is slightly thickened, with a convex edge in side view and a smooth interior.

The shell is deep pinkish-orange to orange-brown, with the body whorl displaying two or more broad bands in a paler shade. The ventral callus ranges from cream-colored to pinkish-brown.

== Distribution ==
This species is endemic to South Africa, and it is found south-east of Cape Recife. Specimens have been found off Algoa Bay and Jeffreys Bay, azt depths between 70 m and 500 m.
