= Admetula striatulata =

Scientific classification
- Kingdom: Animalia
- Phylum: Mollusca
- Class: Gastropoda
- Subclass: Caenogastropoda
- Order: Neogastropoda
- Superfamily: Volutoidea
- Family: Cancellariidae
- Genus: Admetula
- Species: †A. striatulata

Binomial name
- †Admetula striatulata (Deshayes, 1835)

Synonyms
- † Bonellitia striatulata (Deshayes, 1835) superseded combination; † Cancellaria striatulata Deshayes, 1835 superseded combination

Extinct species of gastropod

Admetula striatulata is an extinct species of sea snail, a marine gastropod mollusk in the family Cancellariidae, also referred to as the nutmeg snails.

== Distribution ==
Fossils have been found in Eocene strata in Belgium.
