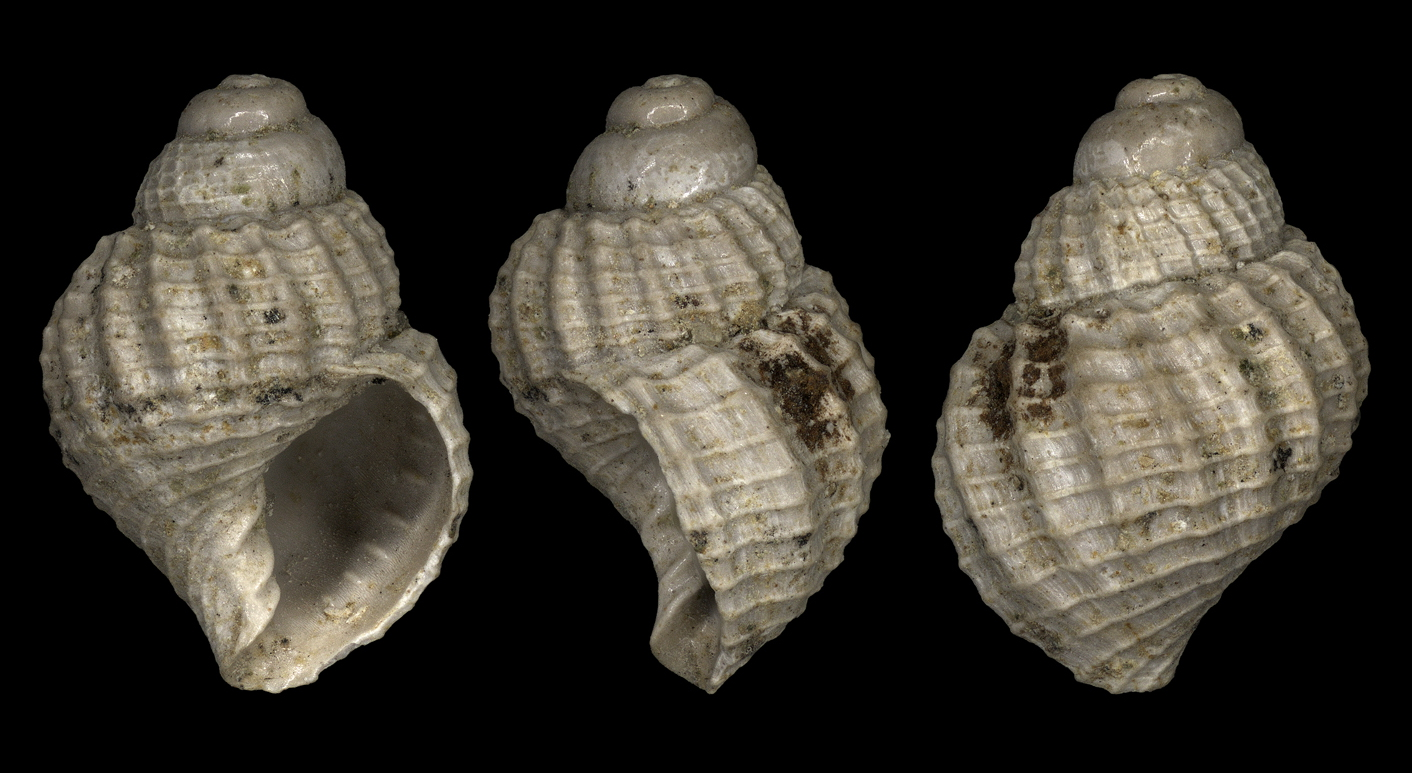
- Shell of † Admetula subevulsa (syntype at MNHN, Paris)

Scientific classification
- Kingdom: Animalia
- Phylum: Mollusca
- Class: Gastropoda
- Subclass: Caenogastropoda
- Order: Neogastropoda
- Superfamily: Volutoidea
- Family: Cancellariidae
- Genus: Admetula
- Species: †A. subevulsa

Binomial name
- †Admetula subevulsa (A. d'Orbigny, 1850)

Synonyms
- † Bonellitia subevulsa (A. d'Orbigny, 1850) superseded combination; † Cancellaria subevulsa A. d'Orbigny, 1850 superseded combination

= Admetula subevulsa =

Extinct species of gastropod

Admetula subevulsa is an extinct species of sea snail, a marine gastropod mollusk in the family Cancellariidae, also referred to as the nutmeg snails.

== Distribution ==
Fossils have been found in Eocene strata in Picardy, France.
