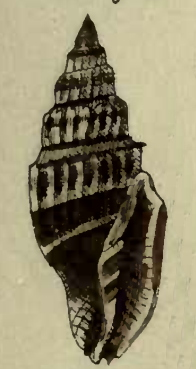
- Drawing of a shell of Vexillum adornatum

Scientific classification
- Kingdom: Animalia
- Phylum: Mollusca
- Class: Gastropoda
- Subclass: Caenogastropoda
- Order: Neogastropoda
- Superfamily: Turbinelloidea
- Family: Costellariidae
- Genus: Vexillum
- Species: V. adornatum

Binomial name
- Vexillum adornatum (Tomlin, 1920)

Synonyms
- Mitra ornata A.Adams, 1851; Mitra adornata Tomlin, 1920

= Vexillum adornatum =

Species of gastropod

Vexillum adornatum is a species of small sea snail, marine gastropod mollusk in the family Costellariidae, the ribbed miters.

== Description ==
The white shell has chestnut bands, or is dark colored with white bands. The acute shell is oblong-fusiform. Its acute whorls show revolving striae between the ribs. The shell consists of nine whorls, angulate at the sutures. The anterior part of the body whorl is slightly umbilicate and recurved. The columella contains four plaits. The outer lip is slightly angulate.
