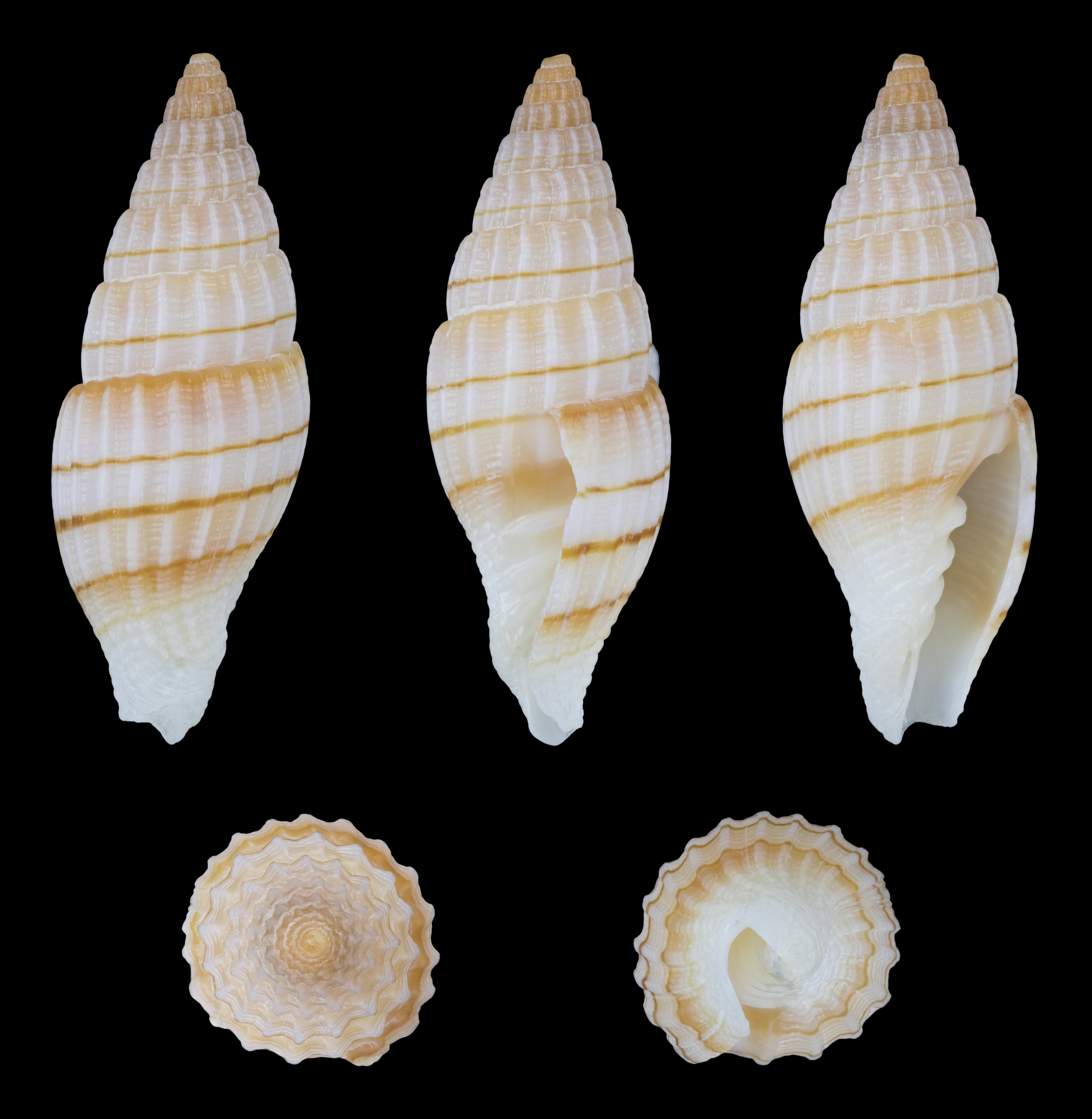

Scientific classification
- Kingdom: Animalia
- Phylum: Mollusca
- Class: Gastropoda
- Subclass: Caenogastropoda
- Order: Neogastropoda
- Family: Costellariidae
- Genus: Vexillum
- Species: V. buriasense

Binomial name
- Vexillum buriasense (Tomlin, 1920)

Synonyms
- Mitra buriasensis Tomlin, 1920 (original combination); Mitra elegans Reeve, 1845 (junior secondary homonym of Voluta elegans Link, 1807; Mitra buriasensis is a replacement name); Vexillum (Costellaria) buriasense (Tomlin, 1920); Vexillum seroi T. Cossignani, 2022 junior subjective synonym

= Vexillum buriasense =

Species of gastropod

Vexillum buriasense is a species of small sea snail, marine gastropod mollusk in the family Costellariidae, the ribbed miters.

== Description ==
The length of the shell attains 23 mm. It has a shape in the form of a spiral and is white and cream in color.

== Distribution ==
This marine species occurs off the Philippines, Papua New Guinea and Australia.
