= Marginella epipolia =

Scientific classification
- Kingdom: Animalia
- Phylum: Mollusca
- Class: Gastropoda
- Subclass: Caenogastropoda
- Order: Neogastropoda
- Family: Marginellidae
- Genus: Marginella
- Species: M. epipolia

Binomial name
- Marginella epipolia Tomlin 1921

Synonyms
- Marginella confortinii Bozzetti, 1993

Species of sea snail

Marginella epipolia is a species of sea snail, a marine gastropod mollusk in the family Marginellidae, the margin snails.
