= Volvarina pericalles =

Scientific classification
- Kingdom: Animalia
- Phylum: Mollusca
- Class: Gastropoda
- Subclass: Caenogastropoda
- Order: Neogastropoda
- Family: Marginellidae
- Subfamily: Marginellinae
- Genus: Volvarina
- Species: V. pericalles

Binomial name
- Volvarina pericalles (Tomlin, 1916)

Synonyms
- Marginella pericalles Tomlin, 1916 · (original combination)

Species of gastropod

Volvarina pericalles is a species of sea snail, a marine gastropod mollusk in the family Marginellidae, the margin snails.

== Taxonomy ==
This is a new name for Marginella guttula Reeve, 1865 non Sowerby, 1846.
