= Conus trigonicus =

Conservation status
- Extinct (IUCN 3.1)

Scientific classification
- Kingdom: Animalia
- Phylum: Mollusca
- Class: Gastropoda
- Subclass: Caenogastropoda
- Order: Neogastropoda
- Superfamily: Conoidea
- Family: Conidae
- Genus: Conus
- Species: †C. trigonicus

Binomial name
- †Conus trigonicus Tomlin, 1937

Species of sea snail

Conus trigonicus is an extinct species of sea snail, a marine gastropod mollusk in the family Conidae, the cone snails, cone shells or cones.

== Distribution ==
This marine species is only known as a fossil, endemic to New Zealand.
