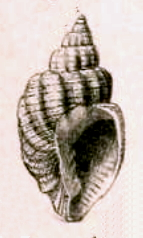
- Shell of † Admetula strictoturrita (holotype)

Scientific classification
- Kingdom: Animalia
- Phylum: Mollusca
- Class: Gastropoda
- Subclass: Caenogastropoda
- Order: Neogastropoda
- Superfamily: Volutoidea
- Family: Cancellariidae
- Genus: Admetula
- Species: †A. strictoturrita

Binomial name
- †Admetula strictoturrita (Sacco, 1894)

Synonyms
- † Admetula altavillae (Libassi, 1859) junior homonym; † Cancellaria (Contortia) altavillae Libassi, 1859 superseded rank; † Cancellaria (Contortia) altavillae var. strictoturrita Sacco, 1894 superseded combination; † Cancellaria contorta var. altavillae Libassi, 1859 (superseded combination (invalid: junior; homonym of Cancellaria altavillae Aradas, 1846)

= Admetula strictoturrita =

Extinct species of gastropod

Admetula strictoturrita is an extinct species of sea snail, a marine gastropod mollusk in the family Cancellariidae, also referred to as the nutmeg snails.

== Distribution ==
Fossils have been found in Tertiary strata in Piedmont and Liguria, Italy.
