= Admetula postera =

Scientific classification
- Kingdom: Animalia
- Phylum: Mollusca
- Class: Gastropoda
- Subclass: Caenogastropoda
- Order: Neogastropoda
- Superfamily: Volutoidea
- Family: Cancellariidae
- Genus: Admetula
- Species: †A. postera

Binomial name
- †Admetula postera (Beyrich, 1856)

Synonyms
- † Cancellaria evulsa postera Beyrich, 1856

Extinct species of gastropod

Admetula postera is an extinct species of sea snail, a marine gastropod mollusk in the family Cancellariidae, also referred to as the nutmeg snails.

== Description ==
The length of the shell attains 19 mm, its diameter is 12 mm.

== Distribution ==
Fossils have been found in late Oligocene–early Miocene strata in Northern Germany and in Hungary.
