= Gibberula differens =

Scientific classification
- Kingdom: Animalia
- Phylum: Mollusca
- Class: Gastropoda
- Subclass: Caenogastropoda
- Order: Neogastropoda
- Family: Cystiscidae
- Subfamily: Cystiscinae
- Genus: Gibberula
- Species: G. differens

Binomial name
- Gibberula differens (E. A. Smith, 1904)

Synonyms
- Granula differens (E. A. Smith, 1904); Marginella barnardi Tomlin, 1919; Marginella differens E. A. Smith, 1904; Marginella taylori Shackleford, 1916

Species of gastropod

Gibberula differens is a species of sea snail, a marine gastropod mollusk, in the family Cystiscidae.
