= Admetula rosenkrantzi =

Scientific classification
- Kingdom: Animalia
- Phylum: Mollusca
- Class: Gastropoda
- Subclass: Caenogastropoda
- Order: Neogastropoda
- Superfamily: Volutoidea
- Family: Cancellariidae
- Genus: Admetula
- Species: †A. rosenkrantzi

Binomial name
- †Admetula rosenkrantzi Schnetler & Petit, 2006

Extinct species of gastropod

Admetula rosenkrantzi is an extinct species of sea snail, a marine gastropod mollusk in the family Cancellariidae, also referred to as the nutmeg snails.

== Distribution ==
Fossils have been found in Early Paleocene strata in Denmark.
