= Admetula serrata =

Scientific classification
- Kingdom: Animalia
- Phylum: Mollusca
- Class: Gastropoda
- Subclass: Caenogastropoda
- Order: Neogastropoda
- Superfamily: Volutoidea
- Family: Cancellariidae
- Genus: Admetula
- Species: †A. serrata

Binomial name
- †Admetula serrata (Bronn, 1831)

Synonyms
- † Cancellaria brandenburgi O. Boettger, 1902 (junior synonym); † Cancellaria serrata Bronn, 1831

Extinct species of gastropod

Admetula serrata is an extinct species of sea snail, a marine gastropod mollusk in the family Cancellariidae, also referred to as the nutmeg snails.

== Distribution ==
Fossils have been found in Middle Miocene strata in Paratethys Sea.
