= Admetula dubia =

Scientific classification
- Kingdom: Animalia
- Phylum: Mollusca
- Class: Gastropoda
- Subclass: Caenogastropoda
- Order: Neogastropoda
- Superfamily: Volutoidea
- Family: Cancellariidae
- Genus: Admetula
- Species: †A. dubia

Binomial name
- †Admetula dubia (Deshayes, 1864)

Synonyms
- † Bonellitia dubia (Deshayes, 1864) superseded combination; † Cancellaria dubia Deshayes, 1864 superseded combination

Extinct species of gastropod

Admetula dubia is an extinct species of sea snail, a marine gastropod mollusk in the family Cancellariidae, also referred to as the nutmeg snails.

== Description ==
The length of the shell attains 11 mm, its diameter is 6.5 mm.

== Distribution ==
Fossils have been found in Eocene strata in Picardy, France.
