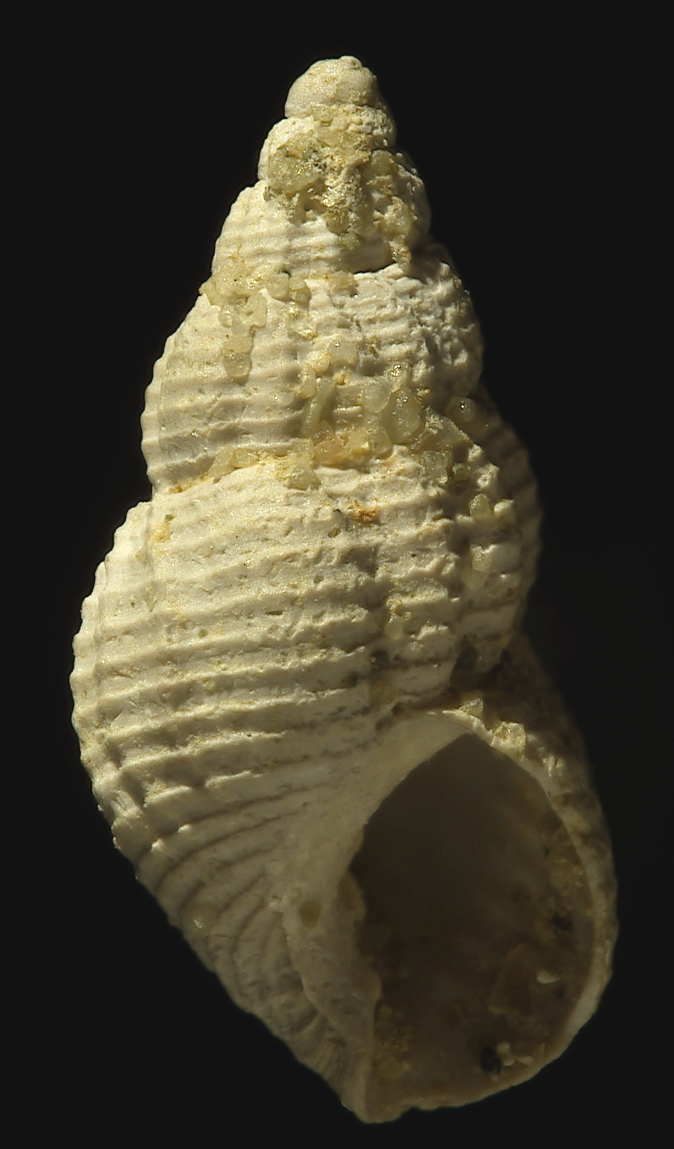
- Shell of † Admetula sinuosa (syntype at MNHN, Paris)

Scientific classification
- Kingdom: Animalia
- Phylum: Mollusca
- Class: Gastropoda
- Subclass: Caenogastropoda
- Order: Neogastropoda
- Superfamily: Volutoidea
- Family: Cancellariidae
- Genus: Admetula
- Species: A. sinuosa

Binomial name
- Admetula sinuosa (Cossmann, 1889)

Synonyms
- † Bonellitia sinuosa (Cossmann, 1889) superseded combination; † Cancellaria (Admetula) sinuosa Cossmann, 1889 superseded combination

= Admetula sinuosa =

Admetula sinuosa Temporal range: eocene

Extinct species of gastropod

Admetula sinuosa is an extinct species of sea snail, a marine gastropod mollusk in the family Cancellariidae, also referred to as the nutmeg snails.

== Description ==
The length of the shell attains 5 mm, its diameter 3 mm.

== Distribution ==
Fossils have been found in Eocene strata in Picardy, France.
