= Admetula funigera =

Scientific classification
- Kingdom: Animalia
- Phylum: Mollusca
- Class: Gastropoda
- Subclass: Caenogastropoda
- Order: Neogastropoda
- Superfamily: Volutoidea
- Family: Cancellariidae
- Genus: Admetula
- Species: †A. funigera

Binomial name
- †Admetula funigera (Staadt, 1913)

Synonyms
- † Admete funigera Staadt, 1913 superseded combination; † Bonellitia funigera (Staadt, 1913) superseded combination

Extinct species of gastropod

Admetula funigera is an extinct species of sea snail, a marine gastropod mollusk in the family Cancellariidae, also referred to as the nutmeg snails.

== Distribution ==
Fossils have been found in Eocene strata in the Paris Basin, France.
