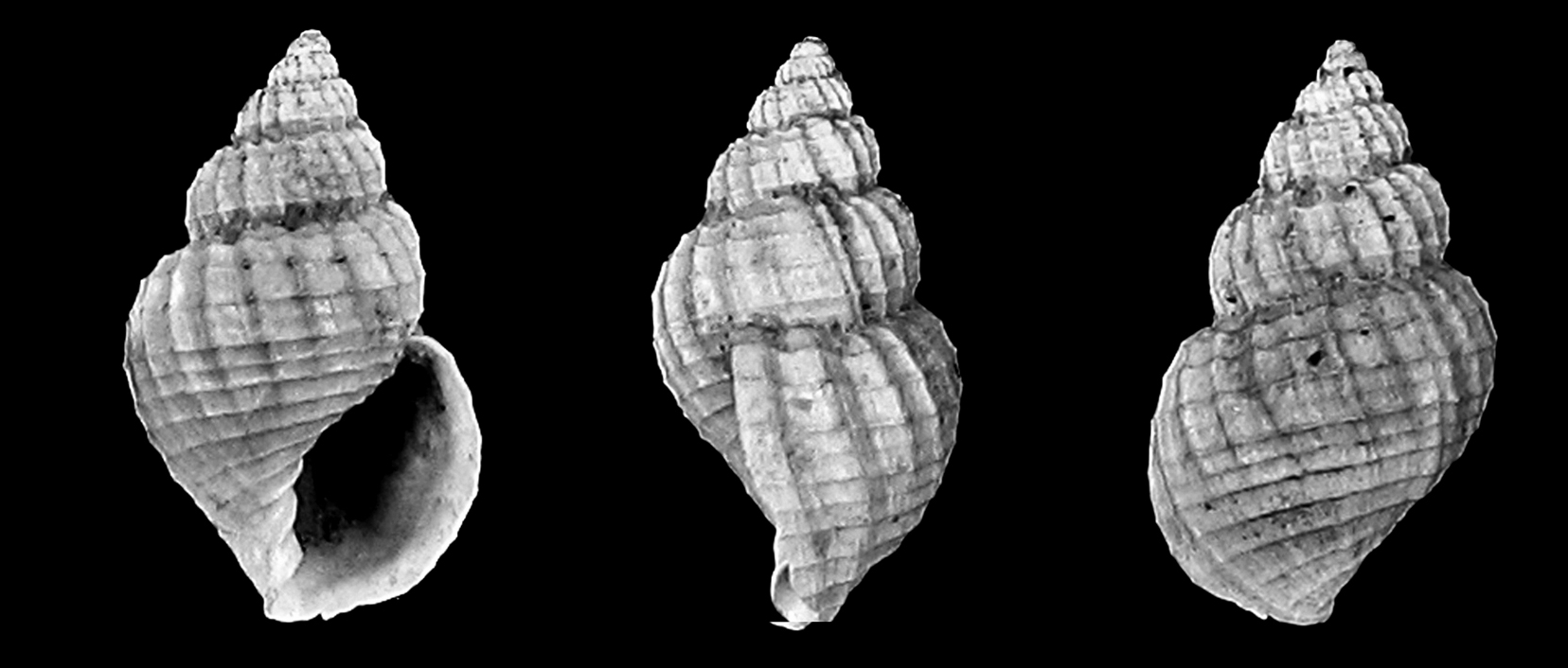
- Shell of Admetula evulsa (syntype at MNHN, Paris)

Scientific classification
- Kingdom: Animalia
- Phylum: Mollusca
- Class: Gastropoda
- Subclass: Caenogastropoda
- Order: Neogastropoda
- Superfamily: Volutoidea
- Family: Cancellariidae
- Genus: Admetula
- Species: †A. evulsa

Binomial name
- †Admetula evulsa (Solander, 1766)

Synonyms
- † Cancellaria (Bonellitia) evulsa Solander, 1766; † Cancellaria evulsa Solander, 1766

= Admetula evulsa =

Extinct species of gastropod

Admetula evulsa is an extinct species of sea snail, a marine gastropod mollusk in the family Cancellariidae, also referred to as the nutmeg snails.

== Distribution ==
Fossils have been found in Eocene strata in Île-de-France, France.
