= Alvania kowiensis =

Scientific classification
- Kingdom: Animalia
- Phylum: Mollusca
- Class: Gastropoda
- Subclass: Caenogastropoda
- Order: Littorinimorpha
- Superfamily: Rissooidea
- Family: Rissoidae
- Genus: Alvania
- Species: A. kowiensis

Binomial name
- Alvania kowiensis Tomlin, 1931

Synonyms
- Alvania ima Bartsch, 1915 (invalid: junior homonym of Alvania ima Bartsch, 1911)

Species of gastropod

Alvania kowiensis is a species of small sea snail, a marine gastropod mollusk or micromollusk in the family Rissoidae.

== Description ==
The length of the shell attains 2.3 mm, its diameter 1.5 mm.

== Distribution ==
This species occurs off Port Alfred, South Africa.
