= A. lutea =

A. lutea may refer to:

- Acanthodoris lutea, a sea slug
- Acronicta lutea, a dagger moth
- Actinactia lutea, a tachinid fly
- Admetula lutea, a nutmeg snail
- Alcithoe lutea, a sea snail
- Aletris lutea, a medicinal plant
- Alphonsea lutea, a custard apple
- Anacolosa lutea, a woody plant
- Andrena lutea, a mining bee
- Anistylis lutea, a plant with yellow flowers
- Appendicula lutea, a tropical epiphyte
- Architectonica lutea, a staircase shell
- Arenitalea lutea, a marine bacterium from the genus of Arenitalea
- Argyrotheca lutea, a small lampshell
- Armillaria lutea, a honey mushroom
- Arugisa lutea, an owlet moth
- Asclepias lutea, a milkweed native to eastern North America
- Asphodeline lutea, a perennial plant
- Asplundia lutea, a plant endemic to Ecuador
- Assiminea lutea, a salt marsh snail
- Asteranthe lutea, a custard apple
- Asterina lutea, a sea star
- Asura lutea, a New Guinean moth
- Autochloris lutea, an owlet moth
