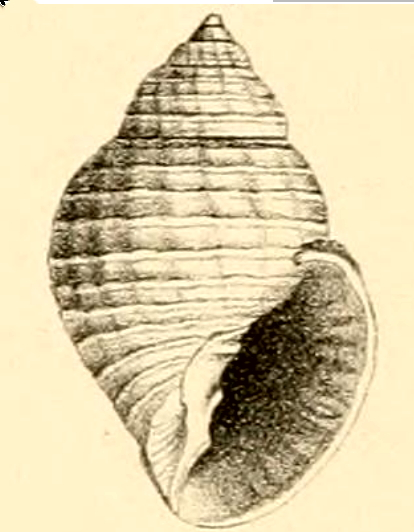
- Shell of Admetula bernayi (holotype)

Scientific classification
- Kingdom: Animalia
- Phylum: Mollusca
- Class: Gastropoda
- Subclass: Caenogastropoda
- Order: Neogastropoda
- Superfamily: Volutoidea
- Family: Cancellariidae
- Genus: Admetula
- Species: A. bernayi

Binomial name
- Admetula bernayi (Cossmann, 1889)

Synonyms
- † Bonellitia bernayi (Cossmann, 1889) superseded combination; † Cancellaria bernayi Cossmann, 1889 superseded combination

= Admetula bernayi =

Extinct species of gastropod

Admetula bernayi is an extinct species of sea snail, a marine gastropod mollusk in the family Cancellariidae, also referred to as the nutmeg snails.

== Description ==
The length of the shell attains 8.5 mm, its diameter is 5.5 mm.

== Distribution ==
Fossils have been found in Eocene strata in Picardy, France.
