= Admetula =

Scientific classification
- Kingdom: Animalia
- Phylum: Mollusca
- Class: Gastropoda
- Subclass: Caenogastropoda
- Order: Neogastropoda
- Superfamily: Volutoidea
- Family: Cancellariidae
- Genus: Admetula; Cossmann, 1889

Type species
- † Cancellaria evulsa Solander in Brander, 1766

Species
- See text

Genus of gastropods

Admetula is a genus of sea snails, marine gastropod mollusks in the family Cancellariidae, the nutmeg snails.

== Species ==
Species within the genus Admetula include:

- Admetula affluens Bouchet & Petit, 2008
- Admetula afra Petit & Harasewych, 2000
- Admetula atopodonta (Petit & Harasewych, 1986)
- Admetula bathynoma Bouchet & Petit, 2008
- Admetula bayeri Petit, 1976
- † Admetula bernayi (Cossmann, 1889)
- Admetula cornidei (Altimira, 1978)
- Admetula deroyae (Petit, 1970)
- † Admetula dubia (Deshayes, 1864)
- Admetula emarginata Bouchet & Petit, 2008
- Admetula epula Petit & Harasewych, 1991
- † Admetula evulsa (Solander, 1766)
- † Admetula faksensis Schnetler & Petit, 2006
- Admetula formosa S.-I Huang & M.-H. Lin, 2020
- † Admetula funigera (Staadt, 1913)
- Admetula garrardi Petit, 1974
- † Admetula girauxi (Cossmann, 1913)
- Admetula gittenbergeri (Verhecken, 2002) n. comb.
- † Admetula irregularis Garvie, 1996
- Admetula italica (D'Ancona, 1872)
- Admetula leechunfui S.-I Huang & M.-H. Lin, 2020
- Admetula lutea Bouchet & Petit, 2008
- Admetula marshalli Bouchet & Petit, 2008
- † Admetula postera (Beyrich, 1856)
- † Admetula rosenkrantzi Schnetler & Petit, 2006
- † Admetula serrata (Bronn, 1831)
- † Admetula sinuosa (Cossmann, 1889)
- † Admetula sphaericula (Cossmann, 1889)
- † Admetula striatulata (Deshayes, 1835)
- † Admetula strictoturrita (Sacco, 1894)
- † Admetula subevulsa (A. d'Orbigny, 1850)
- Admetula superstes (Finlay, 1930)
- Admetula vossi Petit, 1976
- Admetula yerenjii S.-I Huang & M.-H. Lin, 2020

Species brought into synonymy

- † Admetula altavillae (Libassi, 1859): synonym of † Admetula strictoturrita (Sacco, 1894) (junior homonym)

Taxon inquirendum

- Admetula malacitana Vera-Peláez & Muñiz-Solis, 1995
