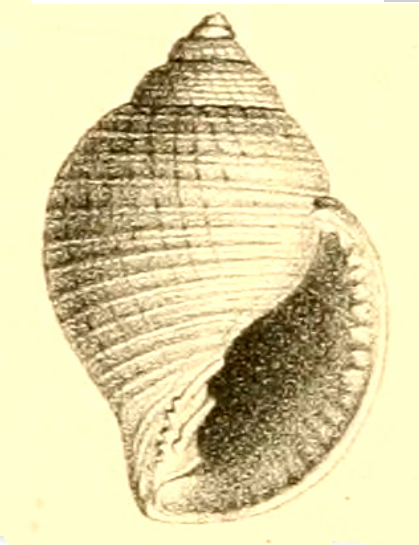
- Shell of † Admetula sphaericula (holotype)

Scientific classification
- Kingdom: Animalia
- Phylum: Mollusca
- Class: Gastropoda
- Subclass: Caenogastropoda
- Order: Neogastropoda
- Superfamily: Volutoidea
- Family: Cancellariidae
- Genus: Admetula
- Species: A. sphaericula

Binomial name
- Admetula sphaericula (Cossmann, 1889)

Synonyms
- † Bonellitia sphaericula (Cossmann, 1889) superseded combination; † Cancellaria (Admetula) sphaericula Cossmann, 1889 superseded combination

= Admetula sphaericula =

Extinct species of gastropod

Admetula sphaericula is an extinct species of sea snail, a marine gastropod mollusk in the family Cancellariidae, also referred to as the nutmeg snails.

== Description ==
The length of the shell attains 10 mm, its diameter is 7 mm.

== Distribution ==
Fossils have been found in Eocene strata in Picardy, France.
