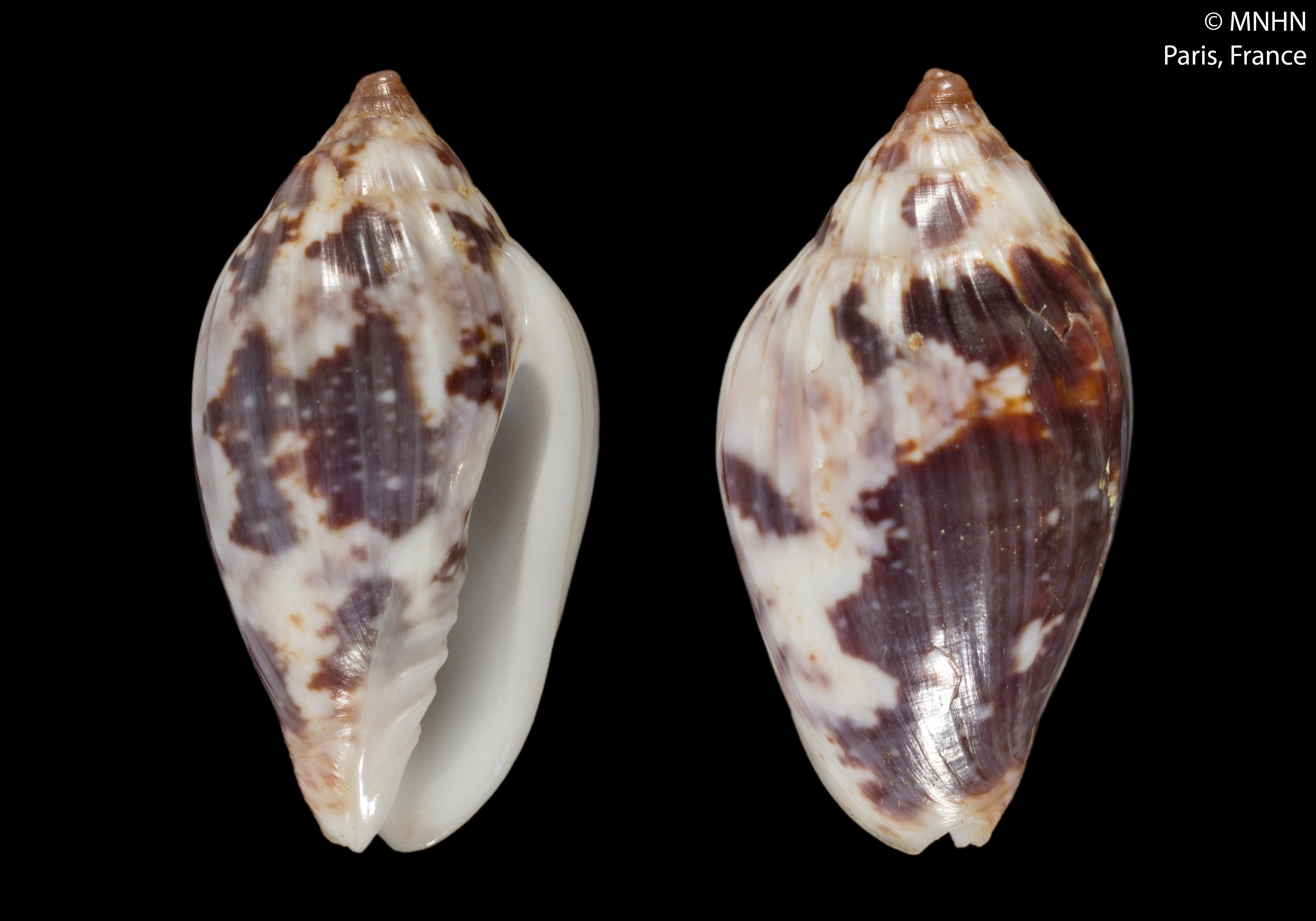
- Shell of Plicoliva ryalli

Scientific classification
- Kingdom: Animalia
- Phylum: Mollusca
- Class: Gastropoda
- Subclass: Caenogastropoda
- Order: Neogastropoda
- Superfamily: Volutoidea
- Family: Volutidae
- Genus: Picoliva; Petuch, 1979

Type species
- Oliva (Plicoliva) zelindae Petuch, 1979

= Picoliva =

Genus of gastropods

Picoliva is a genus of sea snails, marine gastropod molluscs in the subfamily Plicolivinae of the family Volutidae.

== Species ==
Species within the genus Picoliva include:

- Picoliva ryalli Bouchet, 1989
- Picoliva zelindae (Petuch, 1979)
