= Gerdiella corbicula =

Scientific classification
- Kingdom: Animalia
- Phylum: Mollusca
- Class: Gastropoda
- Subclass: Caenogastropoda
- Order: Neogastropoda
- Family: Cancellariidae
- Genus: Gerdiella
- Species: G. corbicula

Binomial name
- Gerdiella corbicula (Dall, 1908)

Synonyms
- Cancellaria corbicula Dall, 1908

Species of gastropod

Gerdiella corbicula is a species of sea snail, a marine gastropod mollusk in the family Cancellariidae, the nutmeg snails.
