= Mericella jucunda =

Scientific classification
- Kingdom: Animalia
- Phylum: Mollusca
- Class: Gastropoda
- Subclass: Caenogastropoda
- Order: Neogastropoda
- Family: Cancellariidae
- Genus: Mericella
- Species: M. jucunda

Binomial name
- Mericella jucunda (Thiele, 1925)

Synonyms
- Cancellaria jucunda Thiele, 1925

Species of gastropod

Mericella jucunda is a species of sea snail, a marine gastropod mollusk in the family Cancellariidae, the nutmeg snails.
