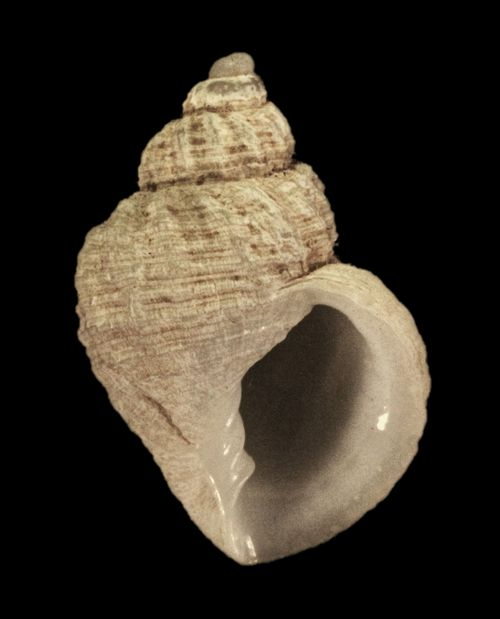
- Shell of Admetula gittenbergeri (holotype at Naturalis Biodiversity Center)

Scientific classification
- Kingdom: Animalia
- Phylum: Mollusca
- Class: Gastropoda
- Subclass: Caenogastropoda
- Order: Neogastropoda
- Family: Cancellariidae
- Genus: Admetula
- Species: A. gittenbergeri

Binomial name
- Admetula gittenbergeri (Verhecken, 2002)

Synonyms
- Bonellitia gittenbergeri Verhecken, 2002

= Admetula gittenbergeri =

Species of gastropod

Admetula gittenbergeri is a species of sea snail, a marine gastropod mollusc in the family Cancellariidae, the nutmeg snails.

== Description ==
The size of the whitish, solid shell varies between 11 mm and 14 mm. The protoconch is paucispiral with a slightly less than one whorl and shows fine spiral striae (stretch marks). The teleoconch consists of 3.5 whorls with the second and the third whorl showing five spiral bands and the body whorl with twelve spiral bands. The whorls are axially crossed by twelve and thirteen rounded ribs on the second and third whorls and by ten ribs on the body whorl. The white semicircular aperture has a nacreous gloss. The thick outer lip has no inner lirae. The columella shows two folds with a conspicuous tooth close to the siphonal canal. The umbilicus is closed by a callus. The periostracum is covered with thin, short hairs between the spiral cords.

== Distribution ==
This species is found in the Atlantic Ocean off Mauritania.
