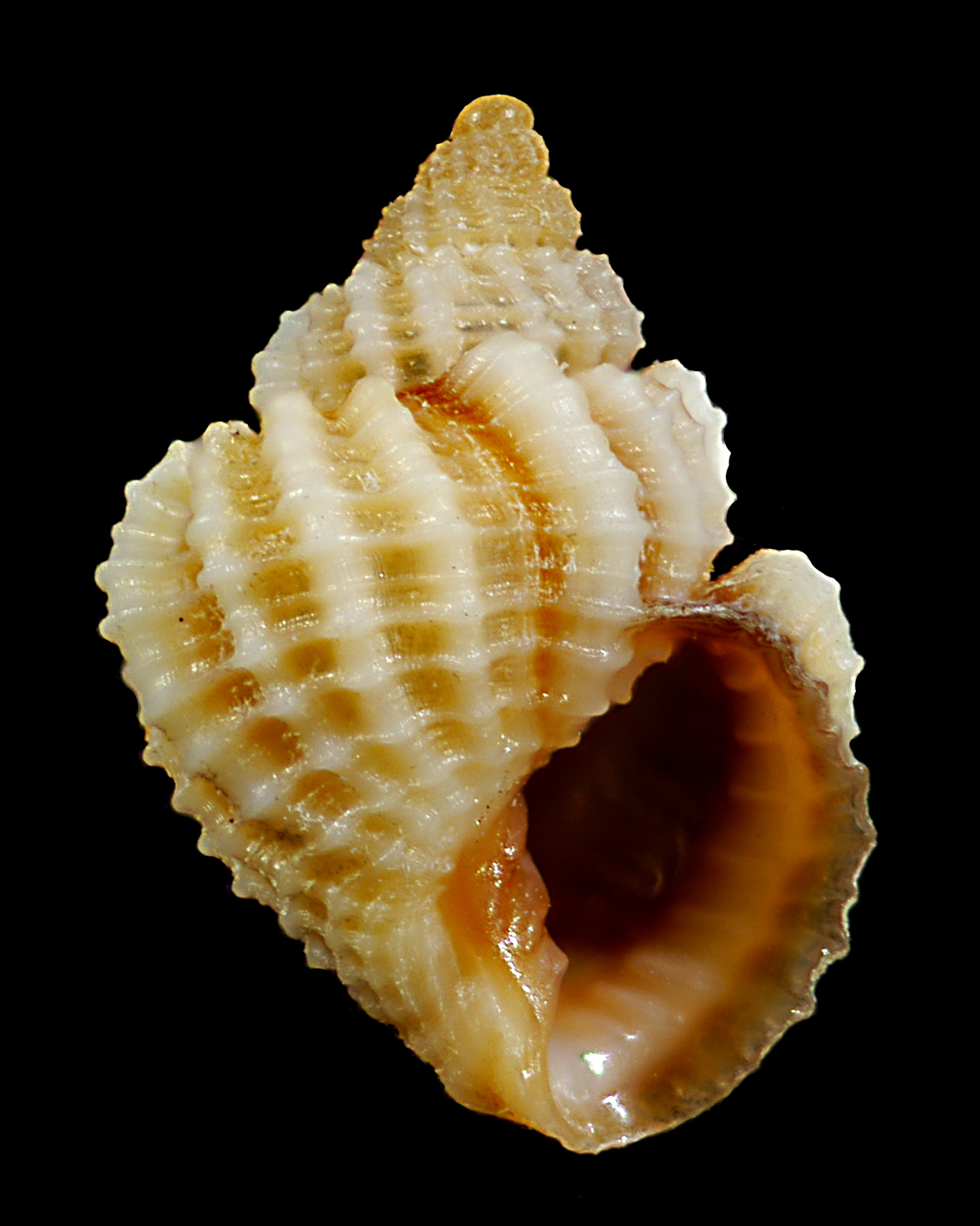
- Shell of Admetula formosa (specimen at MNHN, Paris)

Scientific classification
- Kingdom: Animalia
- Phylum: Mollusca
- Class: Gastropoda
- Subclass: Caenogastropoda
- Order: Neogastropoda
- Family: Cancellariidae
- Genus: Admetula
- Species: A. formosa

Binomial name
- Admetula formosa S.-I Huang & M.-H. Lin, 2020

= Admetula formosa =

Species of gastropod

Admetula formosa is a species of sea snail, a marine gastropod mollusk in the family Cancellariidae, the nutmeg snails.

== Description ==
The shell size is 10 mm.

== Distribution ==
This marine species occurs in the East China Sea and in the Caribbean Sea off Guadeloupe.
