= Admetula yerenjii =

Scientific classification
- Kingdom: Animalia
- Phylum: Mollusca
- Class: Gastropoda
- Subclass: Caenogastropoda
- Order: Neogastropoda
- Family: Cancellariidae
- Genus: Admetula
- Species: A. yerenjii

Binomial name
- Admetula yerenjii S.-I Huang & M.-H. Lin, 2020

Species of gastropod

Admetula yerenjii is a species of sea snail, a marine gastropod mollusk in the family Cancellariidae, the nutmeg snails.

== Distribution ==
This marine species occurs in the East China Sea.
