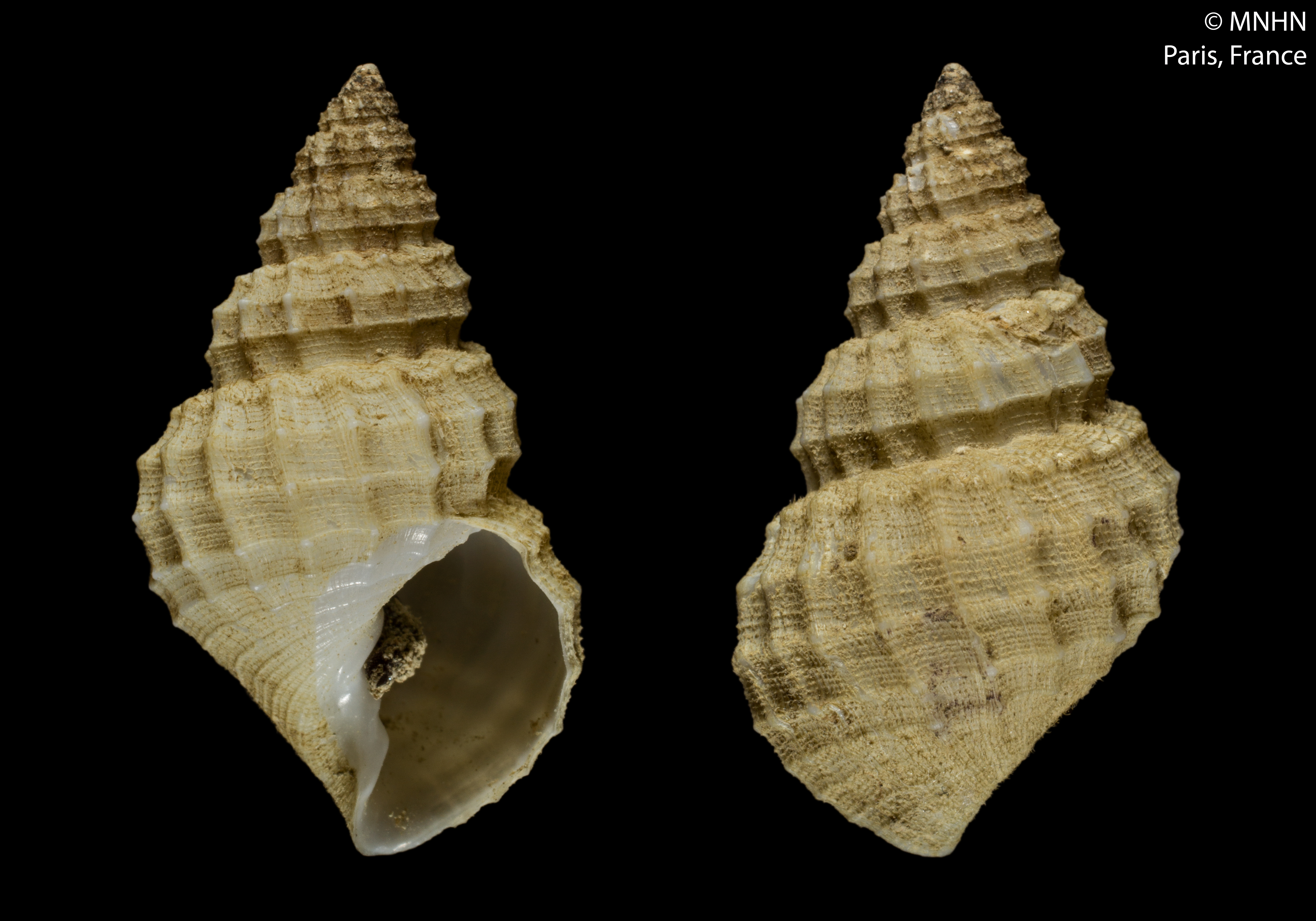

Scientific classification
- Kingdom: Animalia
- Phylum: Mollusca
- Class: Gastropoda
- Subclass: Caenogastropoda
- Order: Neogastropoda
- Family: Cancellariidae
- Genus: Admetula
- Species: A. affluens

Binomial name
- Admetula affluens Bouchet & Petit, 2008
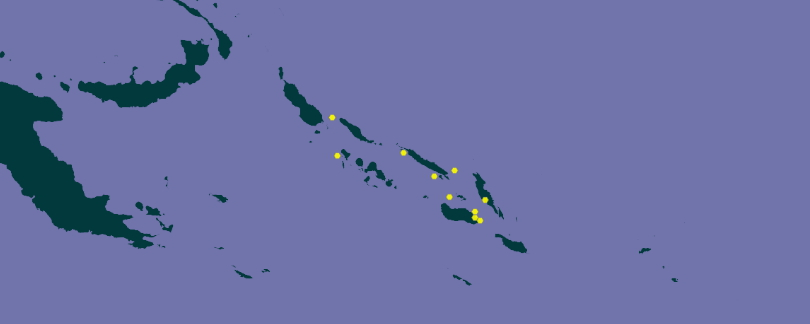

= Admetula affluens =

Species of gastropod

Admetula affluens is a species of sea snail, a marine gastropod mollusc in the family Cancellariidae, the nutmeg snails.

== Description ==
The length of the shell attains 26 mm.

== Distribution ==
This species occurs off the Solomon Islands in the southwestern Pacific Ocean and off Papua New Guinea.
