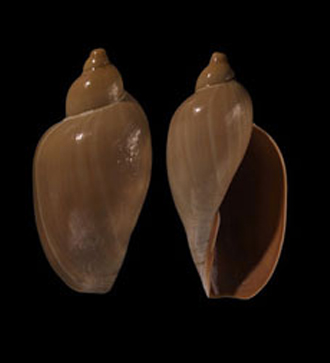
- Two views of a shell of Marginellona gigas

Scientific classification
- Kingdom: Animalia
- Phylum: Mollusca
- Class: Gastropoda
- Subclass: Caenogastropoda
- Order: Neogastropoda
- Superfamily: Volutoidea
- Family: Marginellonidae; Coan, 1965

= Marginellonidae =

Family of sea snails

Marginellonidae are a taxonomic family of deep water marine gastropod molluscs in the clade Neogastropoda.

== Genera ==
- Afrivoluta Tomlin, 1947
- Marginellona Martens, 1904
- Tateshia Kosuge, 1947
