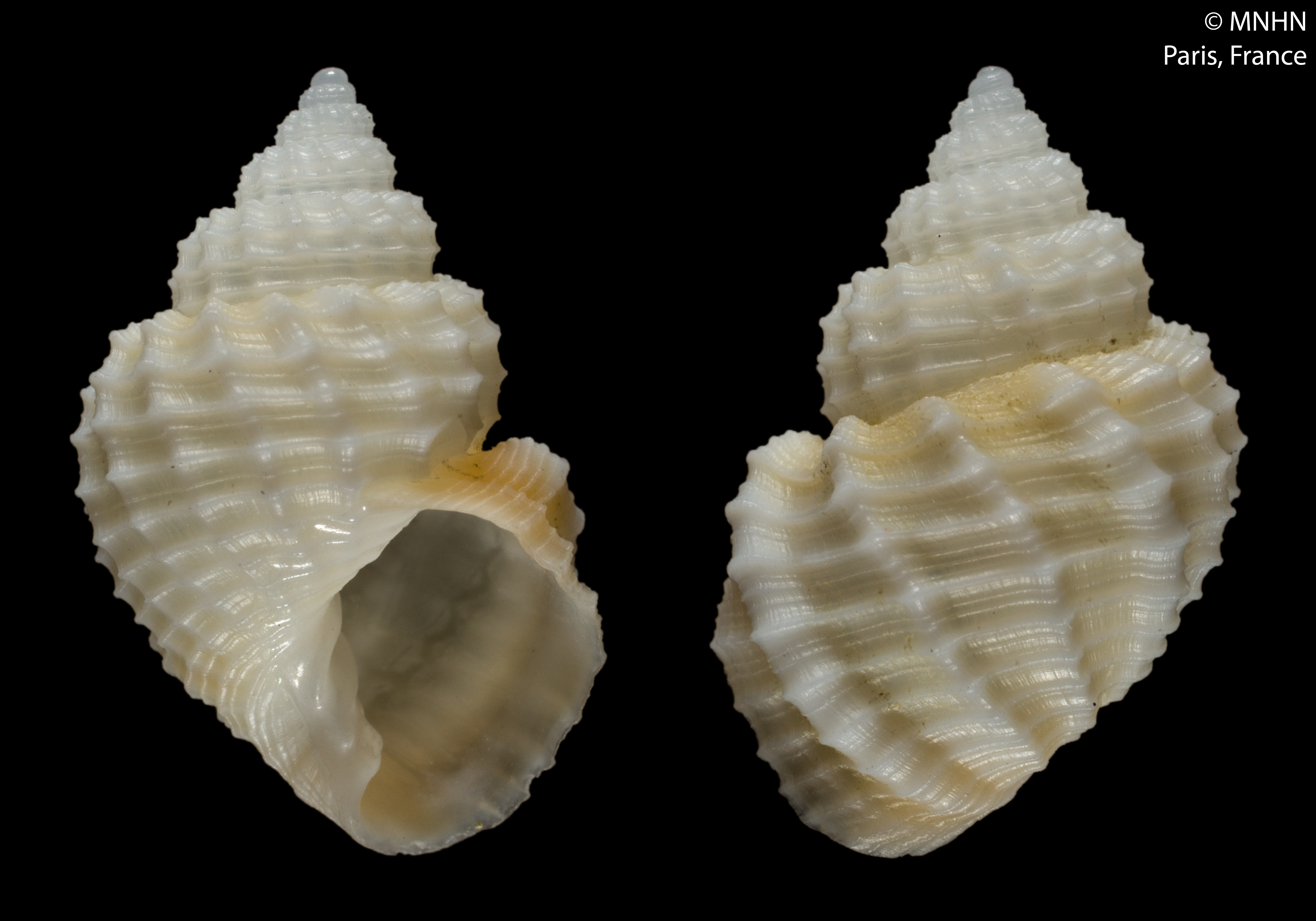
- Shell of Admetula emarginata (holotype at MNHN, Paris)

Scientific classification
- Kingdom: Animalia
- Phylum: Mollusca
- Class: Gastropoda
- Subclass: Caenogastropoda
- Order: Neogastropoda
- Family: Cancellariidae
- Genus: Admetula
- Species: A. emarginata

Binomial name
- Admetula emarginata Bouchet & Petit, 2008
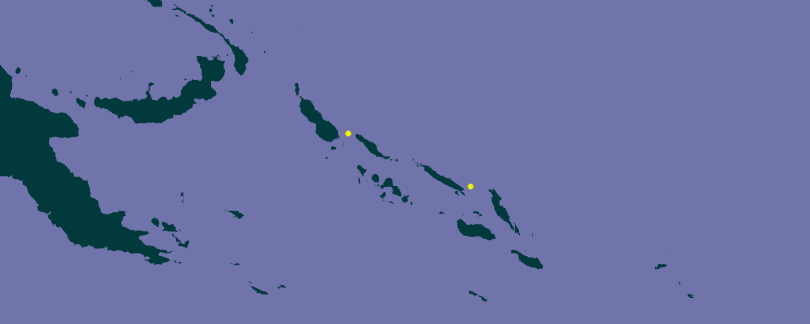

= Admetula emarginata =

Species of gastropod

Admetula emarginata is a species of sea snail, a marine gastropod mollusc in the family Cancellariidae, the nutmeg snails.

== Distribution ==
This marine species occurs on the Chesterfield Plateau, New Caledonia and off the Solomon Islands.
