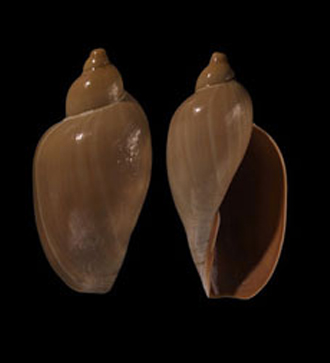
- Two views of a shell of Marginellona gigas trawled in 600m near Pratas Island, Taiwan

Scientific classification
- Kingdom: Animalia
- Phylum: Mollusca
- Class: Gastropoda
- Subclass: Caenogastropoda
- Order: Neogastropoda
- Family: Marginellonidae
- Genus: Marginellona
- Species: M. gigas

Binomial name
- Marginellona gigas Martens, 1904

Synonyms
- Marginella gigas Martens, 1904 (basionym); Sigaluta pratasensis Rehder, 1967

= Marginellona gigas =

Species of gastropod

Marginellona gigas is a species of very large deepwater sea snail, a marine gastropod mollusk in the family Marginellidae. This species was originally thought to be a volute, in the family Volutidae, but it is in fact a giant marginellid.

This is the only known species in the genus Marginellona; in other words, Marginellona is a monotypic genus.

== Snail description ==
The shell can be as large 157 mm. It is thin, translucent, porcellaneous, and narrowly ovate in shape. The protoconch consists of 2-2½ rapidly expanding (diameter 0.5 mm to 11.5 mm in 2 whorls), smooth, conical, glassy whorls, deflected from coiling axis of teleconch by up to 15°. The transition to teleconch is abrupt, marked by a growth line, and accompanied by the formation of thin parietal callus. The teleoconch has up to 3 smooth, inflated, convex, rapidly descending whorls. The suture has abutting whorls. The shell surface is smooth, glazed, and lacking spiral and axial sculpture. The aperture is ovate, narrow posteriorly, broad anteriorly. The outer lip is smooth.

The inner lip is smooth, with thin, whitish inductural overglaze in some specimens. The columella has a single sharp, axially-oriented columellar fold and a sharp siphonal fold of nearly equal magnitude. The outer shell surface is uniformly tan to greenish-tan; the aperture is darker brown.

== Type locality ==
West of Sombrero Channel, Nicobar Islands, Indian Ocean, 07°48'N, 92°07'E, in 805 m, coarse sand.

== Distribution ==
This species has been collected in the eastern Indian Ocean (Nicobar Islands) and on the upper continental slope along the western margin of the South China Sea. The bathymetric range is 380–1000 m.

== Reports ==
W. of Pratas Reef, South of China Sea, 20°37'N, 115°43'E [380 m]
E. of Phan Thiet, Vietnam, South China Sea, 10°41'08"N, 109°53'08"E [495–500 m]
E. of Phan Ly, Vietnam, South China sea, 11°09'06"N, 110°02'00"E [700 m]
E. of Phan Thiet, Vietnam, South China Sea, 10°01'00"N, 109°55'00"E [460 m]
E. of Ba Ria, Vietnam, South China Sea, 10°40'08"N, 110°03'00"E [760–800 m]
E. of Phan Ly, Vietnam, South China sea, 11°10'00"N, 110°10'00"E [1000–1280 m]
