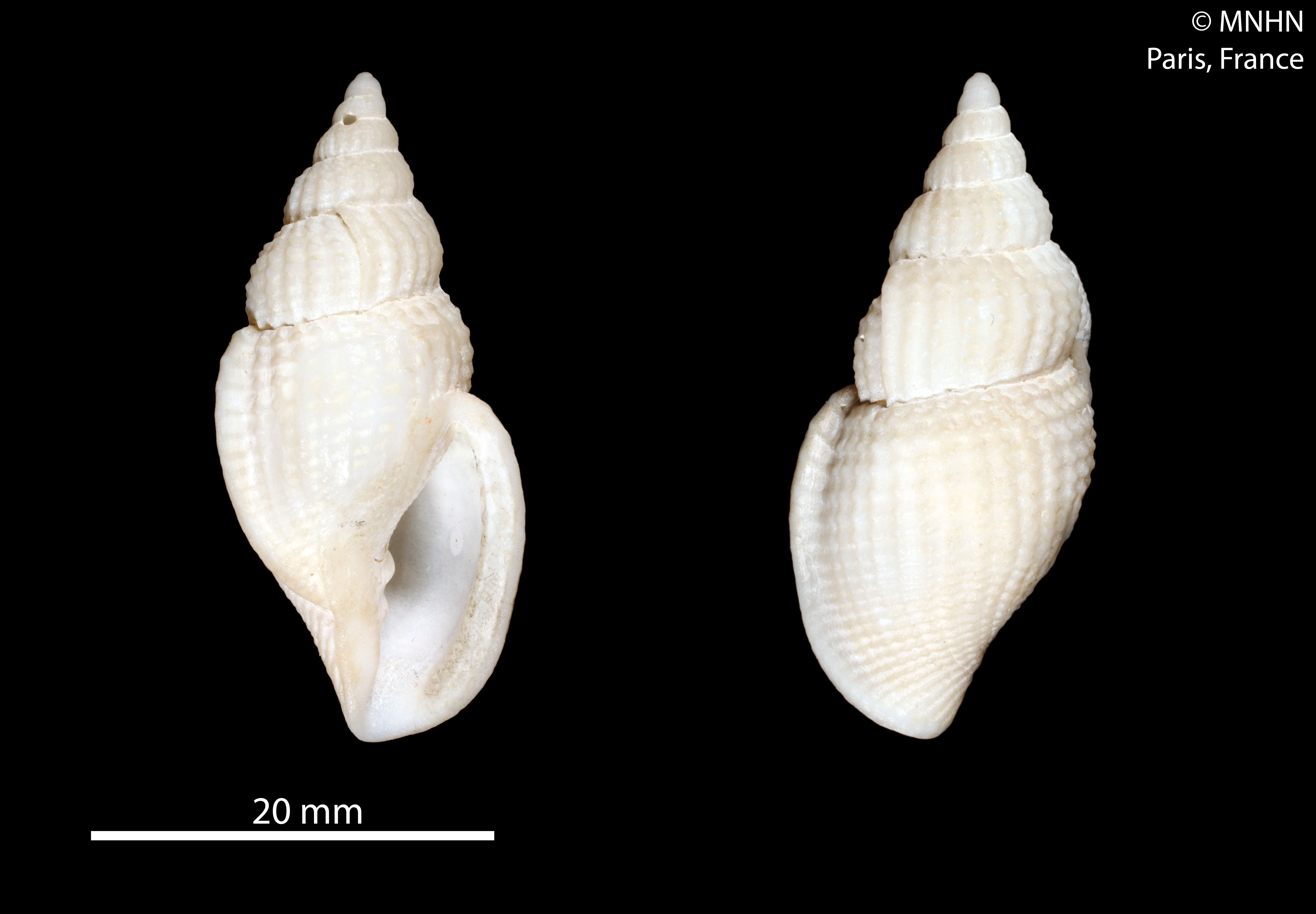

Scientific classification
- Kingdom: Animalia
- Phylum: Mollusca
- Class: Gastropoda
- Subclass: Caenogastropoda
- Order: Neogastropoda
- Family: Cancellariidae
- Genus: Mericella
- Species: M. bozzettii

Binomial name
- Mericella bozzettii Petit & Harasewych, 1993

= Mericella bozzettii =

Species of gastropod

Mericella bozzettii is a species of sea snail, a marine gastropod mollusk in the family Cancellariidae, the nutmeg snails.
