= Admetula italica =

Scientific classification
- Kingdom: Animalia
- Phylum: Mollusca
- Class: Gastropoda
- Subclass: Caenogastropoda
- Order: Neogastropoda
- Family: Cancellariidae
- Genus: Admetula
- Species: A. italica

Binomial name
- Admetula italica (Verhecken, 2002)

Synonyms
- Cancellaria italica D’Ancona, 1872; Admetula malacitana Vera-Peláez & Muñiz-Solis, 1995; Admetula italica Vera-Peláez et al. 1995; Contortia italica Landau et al. 2006

Species of gastropod

Admetula italica is a species of sea snail, a marine gastropod mollusk in the family Cancellariidae, the nutmeg snails.

== Description ==
The white, turriculate shell grows to a length of 11.5 mm. The paucispiral protoconch has 1¾ whorls. The teleoconch consists of 3¼ rounded whorls with spiral ridges, axially crossed by 16 to 17 distinct ribs. The ribs become confused at the bottom of the body whorl. On the top of each whorl these ribs disappear into the flat sutural zone between the whorls. The aperture is ovoid with the outer lip lacking striae. The columella is strongly inclined abaxially showing two folds, with the rim of the siphonal canal forming the third fold. There is no umbilicus.

== Distribution ==
Fossil shells from the Pliocene have been found in Italy and Southern Spain. Recent specimens have been found in deep waters of the Atlantic Ocean along Mauritania and the Western Sahara. The few recent shells found may be fossils dredged up recently.

== Scientific Classification ==
The Admetula italica is in the Animalia phylum of Mollusca, a prehistoric ancestor to many modern Cancellarioideas. The name Italica refers to the location in which the first of these fossils were discovered by D'Ancona in 1872, who was the first to describe it.
