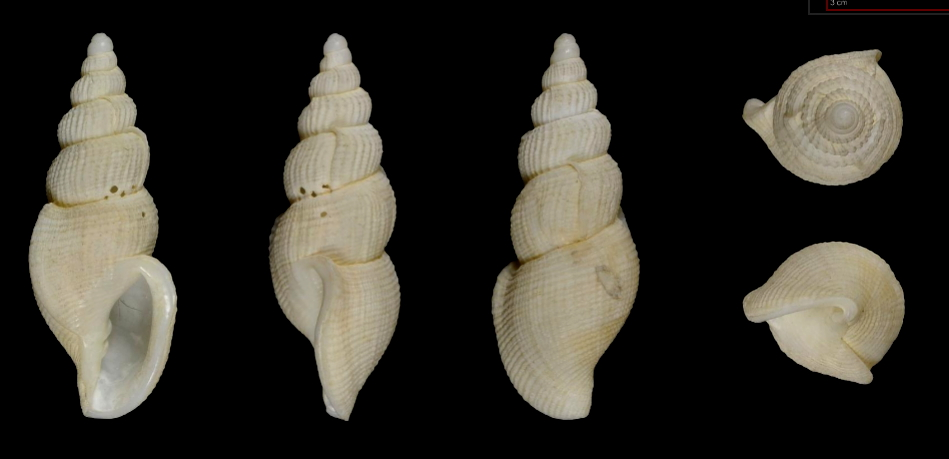
- Shell of Gerdiella gerda (holotype at the Smithsonian Institution)

Scientific classification
- Kingdom: Animalia
- Phylum: Mollusca
- Class: Gastropoda
- Subclass: Caenogastropoda
- Order: Neogastropoda
- Superfamily: Volutoidea
- Family: Cancellariidae
- Genus: Gerdiella
- Species: G. gerda

Binomial name
- Gerdiella gerda Olsson & Bayer, 1972

Synonyms
- Mericella gerda (Olsson & Bayer, 1973)

= Gerdiella gerda =

Species of sea snail

Gerdiella gerda is a species of sea snail, a marine gastropod mollusk in the family Cancellariidae, the nutmeg snails.
