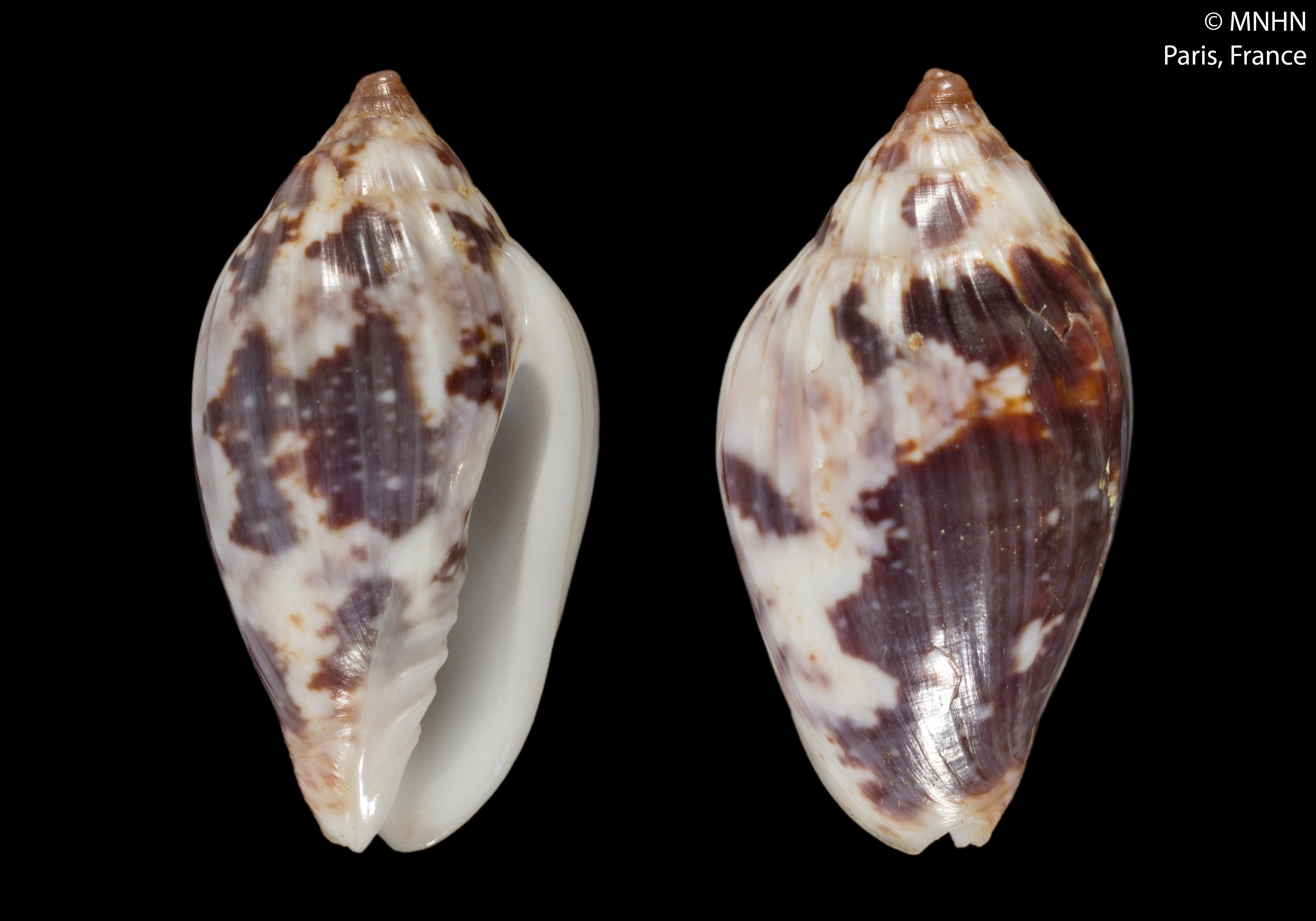
- Shell of Plicoliva ryalli (holotype at MNHN, Paris)

Scientific classification
- Kingdom: Animalia
- Phylum: Mollusca
- Class: Gastropoda
- Subclass: Caenogastropoda
- Order: Neogastropoda
- Family: Volutidae
- Genus: Picoliva
- Species: P. ryalli

Binomial name
- Picoliva ryalli Bouchet, 1989

Synonyms
- Oliva (Plicoliva) Petuch, 1979

= Picoliva ryalli =

Species of gastropod

Picoliva ryalli is a species of sea snail, a marine gastropod mollusc in the family Volutidae, the volutes.

== Distribution ==
This marine species occurs off Ghana.
