= Admetula leechunfui =

Scientific classification
- Kingdom: Animalia
- Phylum: Mollusca
- Class: Gastropoda
- Subclass: Caenogastropoda
- Order: Neogastropoda
- Family: Cancellariidae
- Genus: Admetula
- Species: A. leechunfui

Binomial name
- Admetula leechunfui S.-I Huang & M.-H. Lin, 2020

Species of gastropod

Admetula leechunfui is a species of sea snail, a marine gastropod mollusk in the family Cancellariidae, the nutmeg snails. As a recently described species (2020), there is limited information available on it beyond its basic classification and distribution.

== Distribution ==
A. leechunfui is a marine species native to the East China Sea.
