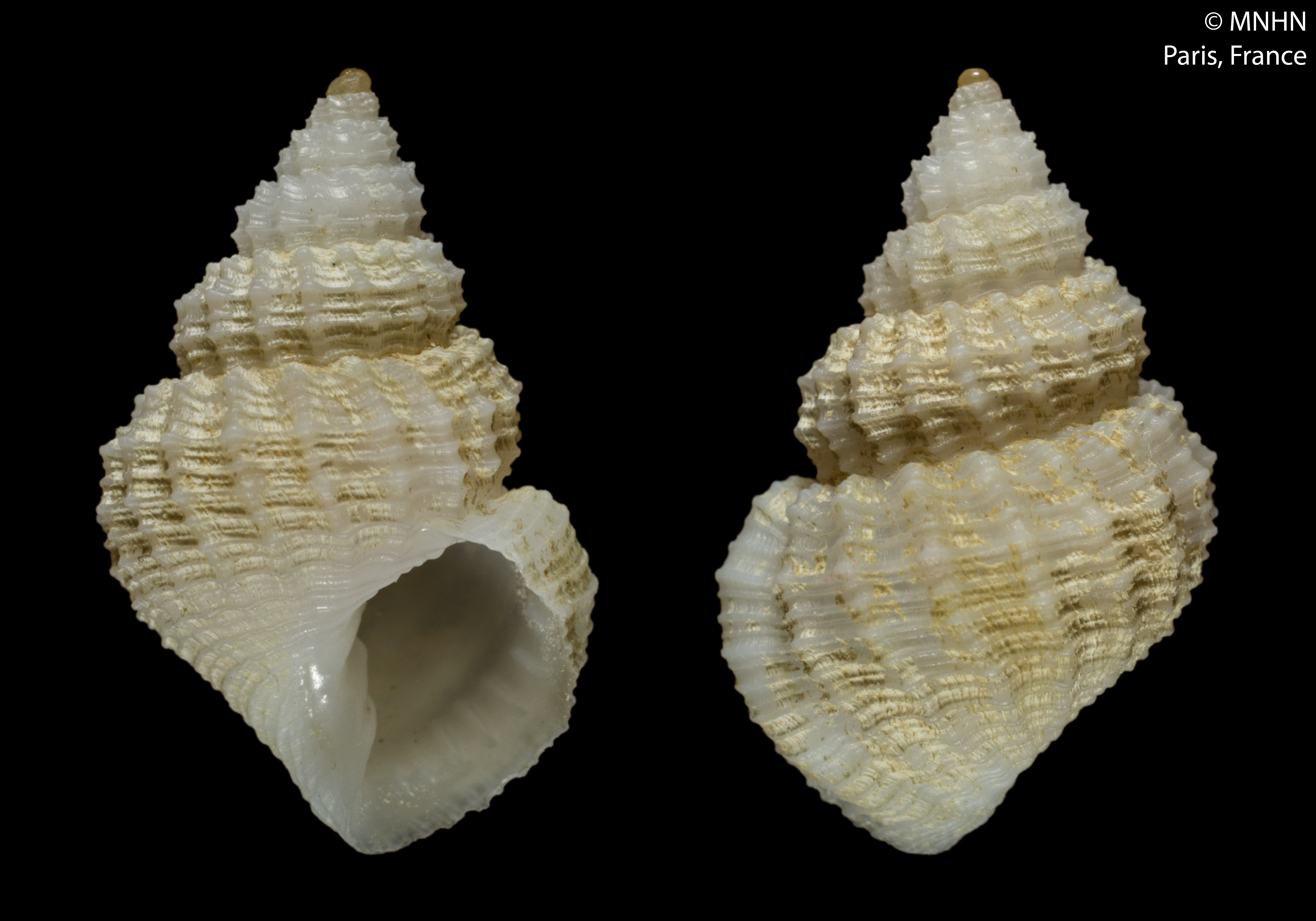
- Shell of Admetula marshalli (holotype at MNHN, Paris)

Scientific classification
- Kingdom: Animalia
- Phylum: Mollusca
- Class: Gastropoda
- Subclass: Caenogastropoda
- Order: Neogastropoda
- Family: Cancellariidae
- Genus: Admetula
- Species: A. marshalli

Binomial name
- Admetula marshalli Bouchet & Petit, 2008

= Admetula marshalli =

Species of gastropod

Admetula marshalli is a species of sea snail, a marine gastropod mollusc in the family Cancellariidae, the nutmeg snails.

== Description ==
The length of the shell attains 17 mm.

== Distribution ==
This marine species occurs off Fiji, Melanesia.
