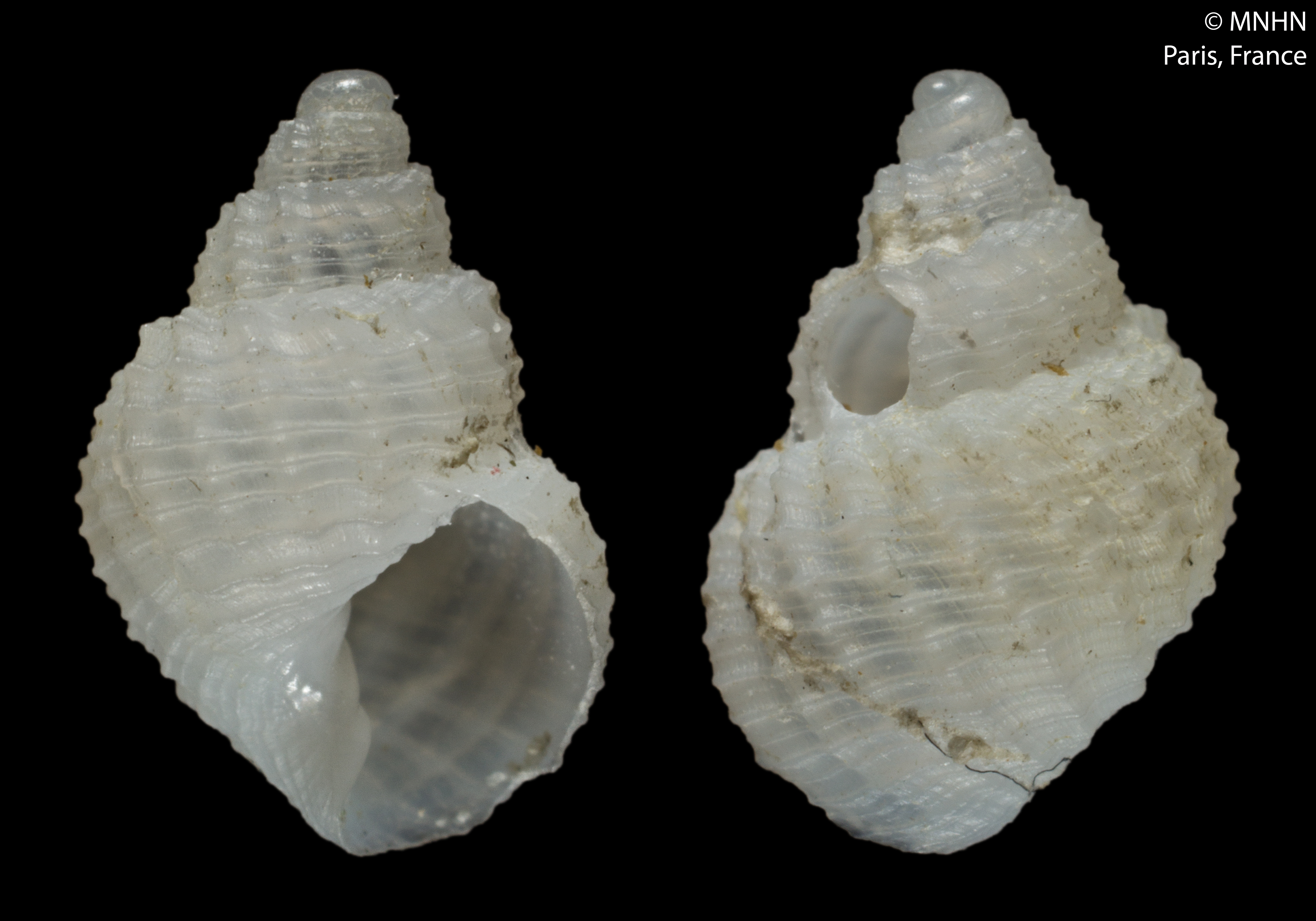
- Shell of Admetula bathynoma (holotype at MNHN, Paris)

Scientific classification
- Kingdom: Animalia
- Phylum: Mollusca
- Class: Gastropoda
- Subclass: Caenogastropoda
- Order: Neogastropoda
- Family: Cancellariidae
- Genus: Admetula
- Species: A. bathynoma

Binomial name
- Admetula bathynoma Bouchet & Petit, 2008
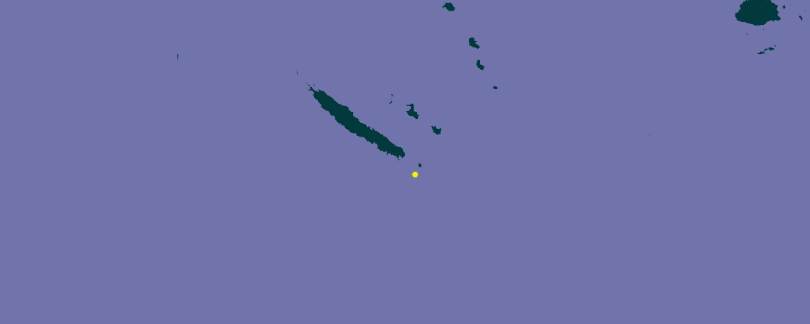

= Admetula bathynoma =

Species of gastropod

Admetula bathynoma is a species of sea snail, a marine gastropod mollusc in the family Cancellariidae, the nutmeg snails.

== Description ==
The length of the shell attains 7.4 mm.

== Distribution ==
This marine species occurs off New Caledonia.
