= Picoliva zelindae =

Scientific classification
- Kingdom: Animalia
- Phylum: Mollusca
- Class: Gastropoda
- Subclass: Caenogastropoda
- Order: Neogastropoda
- Family: Volutidae
- Genus: Picoliva
- Species: P. zelindae

Binomial name
- Picoliva zelindae (Petuch, 1979)

Species of gastropod

Picoliva zelindae is a species of sea snail, a marine gastropod mollusc in the family Volutidae, the volutes.

== Distribution ==
50–60 m. depth, off Espírito Santo, Brazil.
