= Gerdiella alvesi =

Scientific classification
- Kingdom: Animalia
- Phylum: Mollusca
- Class: Gastropoda
- Subclass: Caenogastropoda
- Order: Neogastropoda
- Family: Cancellariidae
- Genus: Gerdiella
- Species: G. alvesi

Binomial name
- Gerdiella alvesi de Lima, de Barros & Petit, 2007

Species of gastropod

Gerdiella alvesi is a species of sea snail, a marine gastropod mollusk in the family Cancellariidae, the nutmeg snails.
