= Bonellitia scobina =

Scientific classification
- Kingdom: Animalia
- Phylum: Mollusca
- Class: Gastropoda
- Subclass: Caenogastropoda
- Order: Neogastropoda
- Family: Cancellariidae
- Genus: Bonellitia
- Species: B. scobina

Binomial name
- Bonellitia scobina (Hedley & Petterd, 1906)

Synonyms
- Cancellaria scobina Hedley & Petterd, 1906

Species of gastropod

Bonellitia scobina is a species of sea snail, a marine gastropod mollusk in the family Cancellariidae, the nutmeg snails.

== Distribution ==
This type of sea snail was documented in the eastern shore of Australia, more specifically in the South-East region around Sydney.
