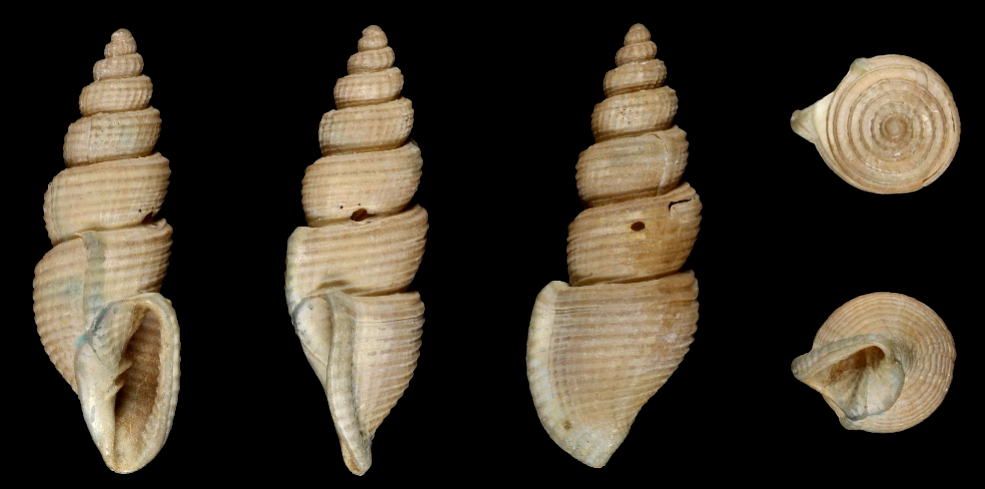
- Shell of Gerdiella cingulata (holotype at the Smithsonian Institution)

Scientific classification
- Kingdom: Animalia
- Phylum: Mollusca
- Class: Gastropoda
- Subclass: Caenogastropoda
- Order: Neogastropoda
- Superfamily: Volutoidea
- Family: Cancellariidae
- Genus: Gerdiella
- Species: G. cingulata

Binomial name
- Gerdiella cingulata (Olsson & Bayer, 1972)

Synonyms
- Mericella cingulata (Olsson & Bayer, 1973)

= Gerdiella cingulata =

Species of sea snail

Gerdiella cingulata is a species of sea snail, a marine gastropod mollusk in the family Cancellariidae, the nutmeg snails.

== Distribution ==
This species occurs in the Caribbean Sea off Jamaica.
