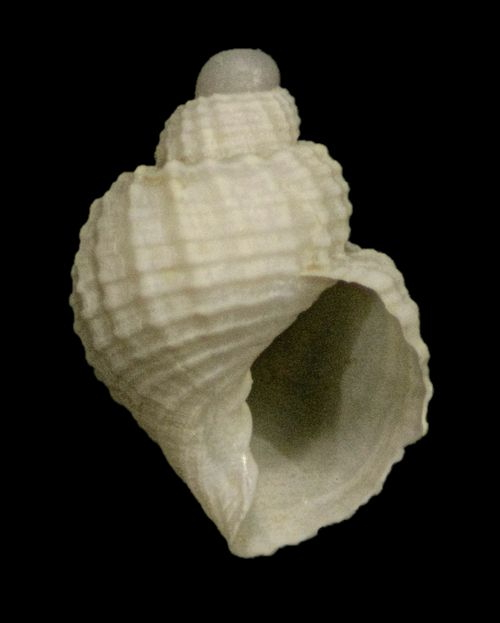
- Shell of Admetula cornidei (specimen at Naturalis Biodiversity Center)

Scientific classification
- Kingdom: Animalia
- Phylum: Mollusca
- Class: Gastropoda
- Subclass: Caenogastropoda
- Order: Neogastropoda
- Family: Cancellariidae
- Genus: Admetula
- Species: A. cornidei

Binomial name
- Admetula cornidei (Altimira, 1978)

Synonyms
- Admete cornidei Altimira, 1978 (original combination); Brocchinia cornidei (Altimira, 1978) (currently placed in genus Admetula); Bonellitia cornidei (Altimira, 1978)

= Admetula cornidei =

Species of gastropod

Admetula cornidei is a species of sea snail, a marine gastropod mollusk in the family Cancellariidae, the nutmeg snails.

== Description ==
The length of the thin, ovately oblong shell varies between 9 mm and 12 mm. Its coloration spans from brown to whitish hues. The protoconch exhibits a paucispiral configuration with its axis slightly deviating from the main axis. The teleoconch consists of 3 ¼ rounded whorls, axially intersected by 15 to 20 broad, rounded ribs, which become less pronounced towards the margin of the oblong aperture (peristome). The outer lip features slight crenulations and contains six lirae (fine linear elevations of shelly material). The columella is inclined abaxially and shows three folds with the siphonal fold notably displaying a discernable tooth. The shell lacks an umbilicus. The periostracum is covered with very short hairs along the spiral lines.

== Distribution ==
This species is found in European waters and in the Atlantic Ocean off Morocco, Western Sahara, Canary Islands and Mauritania at depths between 50 m and 125 m.
