= Admetula deroyae =

Scientific classification
- Kingdom: Animalia
- Phylum: Mollusca
- Class: Gastropoda
- Subclass: Caenogastropoda
- Order: Neogastropoda
- Family: Cancellariidae
- Genus: Admetula
- Species: A. deroyae

Binomial name
- Admetula deroyae (Petit, 1970)

Synonyms
- Agatrix deroyae Petit, 1970

Species of gastropod

Admetula deroyae is a species of sea snail, a marine gastropod mollusk in the family Cancellariidae, the nutmeg snails.

== Description ==
The length of the shell attains 16 mm.

== Distribution ==
This marine species occurs off the Galápagos Islands.
