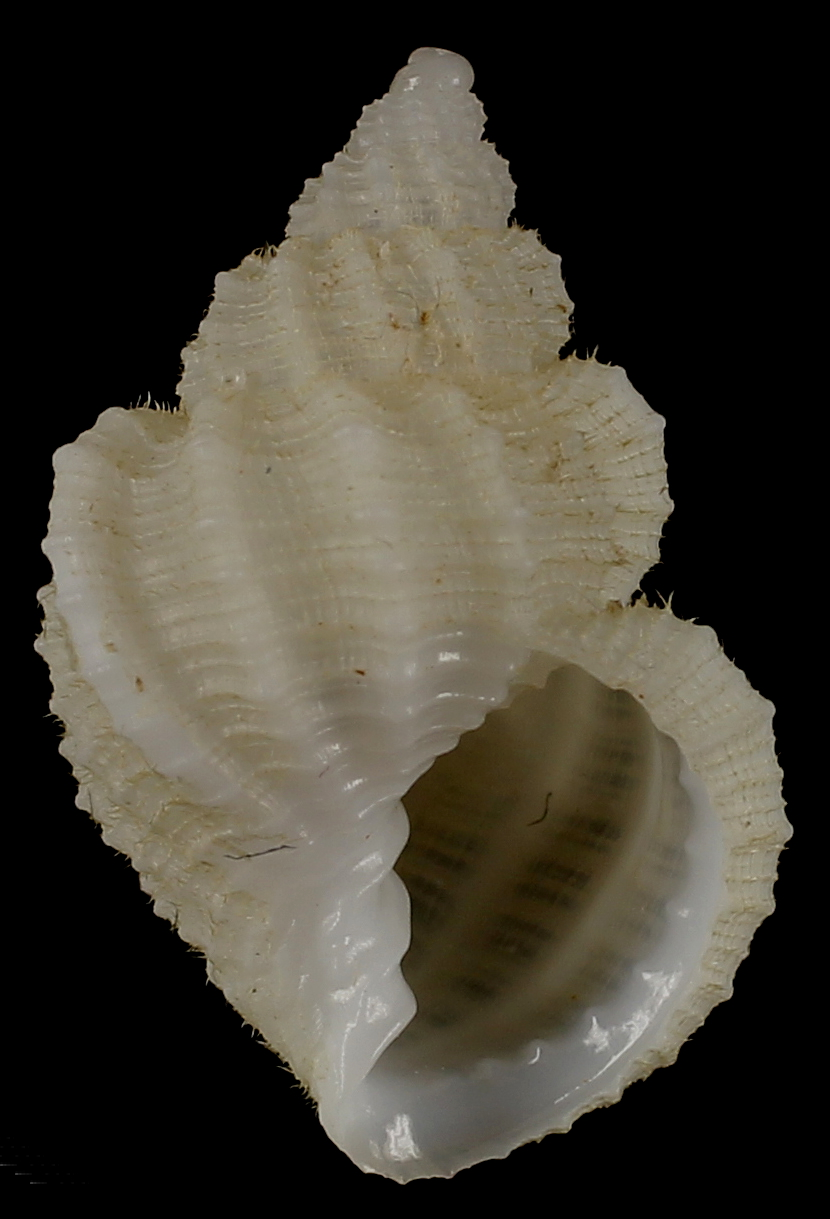
- Shell of Admetula vossi (specimen at MNHN, Paris)

Scientific classification
- Kingdom: Animalia
- Phylum: Mollusca
- Class: Gastropoda
- Subclass: Caenogastropoda
- Order: Neogastropoda
- Family: Cancellariidae
- Genus: Admetula
- Species: A. vossi

Binomial name
- Admetula vossi Petit, 1976
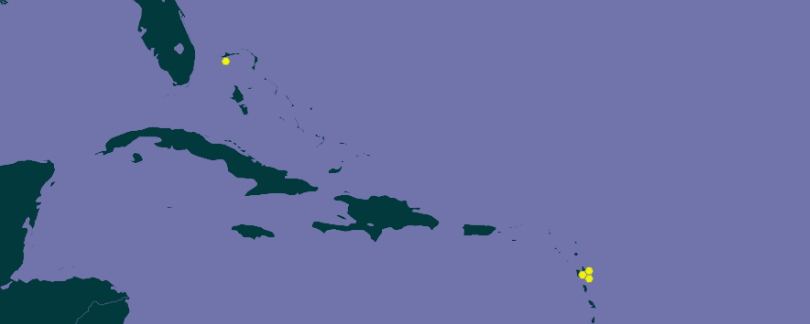

Synonyms
- Bonellitia vossi (Petit, 1976)

= Admetula vossi =

Species of gastropod

Admetula vossi is a species of sea snail, a marine gastropod mollusk in the family Cancellariidae, the nutmeg snails.

== Description ==
The maximum shell size is 13 mm.

== Distribution ==
This species is found off the Bahamas; in the Caribbean Sea off Guadeloupe.
