= Admetula epula =

Scientific classification
- Kingdom: Animalia
- Phylum: Mollusca
- Class: Gastropoda
- Subclass: Caenogastropoda
- Order: Neogastropoda
- Family: Cancellariidae
- Genus: Admetula
- Species: A. epula

Binomial name
- Admetula epula Petit & Harasewych, 1991
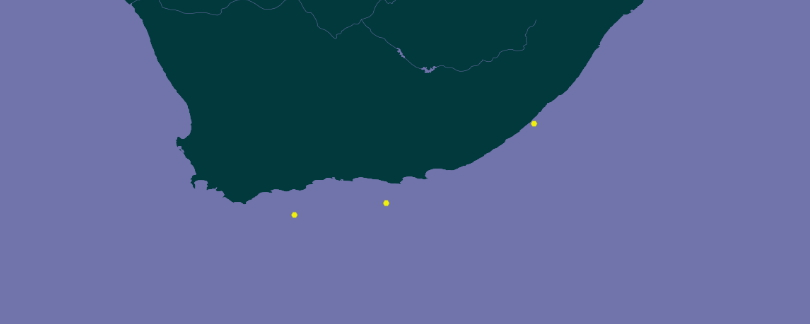

Synonyms
- Bonellitia epula (Petit & Harasewych, 1991)

Species of gastropod

Admetula epula is a species of sea snail, a marine gastropod mollusk in the family Cancellariidae, the nutmeg snails.

== Description ==
The shell size is 10 mm. it is distinguished from other species by its lack of varices and its smooth outer lip.

The specific name is named after the Latin word 'epula' (meaning banquet or feast) since all specimens have been collected from the gut contents of bottom-feeding fish.

== Distribution ==
This marine species occurs off South Africa.
