= Gerdiella =

Scientific classification
- Kingdom: Animalia
- Phylum: Mollusca
- Class: Gastropoda
- Subclass: Caenogastropoda
- Order: Neogastropoda
- Family: Cancellariidae
- Genus: Gerdiella; Olsson & Bayer, 1972

Genus of gastropods

Gerdiella is a genus of sea snails, marine gastropod mollusks in the family Cancellariidae, the nutmeg snails.

== Species ==
Species within the genus Gerdiella include:

- Gerdiella alvesi de Lima, de Barros & Petit, 2007
- Gerdiella cingulata (Olsson & Bayer, 1972): synonym of Mericella cingulata (Olsson & Bayer, 1972)
- Gerdiella gerda (Olsson & Bayer, 1972): synonym of Mericella gerda (Olsson & Bayer, 1972)
- Gerdiella santa Olsson & Bayer, 1972 : synonym of Mericella santa Olsson & Bayer, 1972
