= Admetula superstes =

Scientific classification
- Kingdom: Animalia
- Phylum: Mollusca
- Class: Gastropoda
- Subclass: Caenogastropoda
- Order: Neogastropoda
- Family: Cancellariidae
- Genus: Admetula
- Species: A. superstes

Binomial name
- Admetula superstes (Finlay, 1930)

Synonyms
- Bonellitia superstes Finlay, 1930

Species of gastropod

Admetula superstes is a species of sea snail, a marine gastropod mollusk in the family Cancellariidae, the nutmeg snails.

== Description ==
The length of the shell attains 15 mm, its diameter 9 mm.

== Distribution ==
This marine species is found off North Island, New Zealand.
