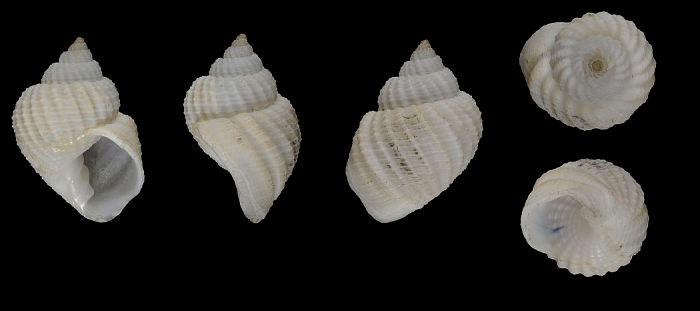
- Shell of Admetula bayeri (holotype at the USNM, Washington)

Scientific classification
- Kingdom: Animalia
- Phylum: Mollusca
- Class: Gastropoda
- Subclass: Caenogastropoda
- Order: Neogastropoda
- Family: Cancellariidae
- Genus: Admetula
- Species: A. bayeri

Binomial name
- Admetula bayeri Petit, 1976
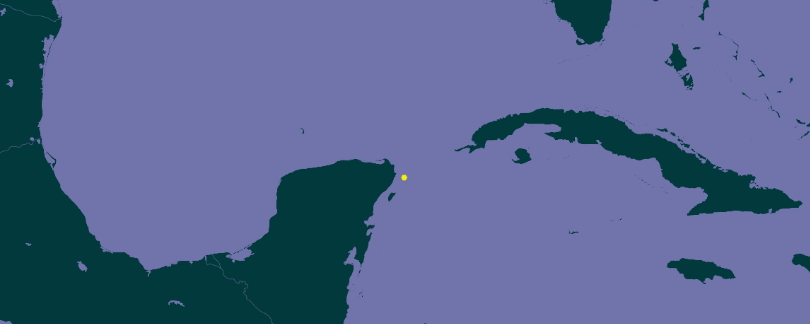

Synonyms
- Bonellitia bayeri (Petit, 1976)

= Admetula bayeri =

Species of gastropod

Admetula bayeri, common name: Bayer's nutmeg, is a species of sea snail; a marine gastropod mollusk in the family Cancellariidae, also referred to as the nutmeg snails. The species is named for Dr. Frederick M. Bayer, Division of Biology and Living Resources of the Rosenstiel School of Marine and Atmospheric Sciences, University of Miami.

== Description ==
The length of the shell attains 21.6 mm to 22 mm. It has a primarily white shell.

== Distribution ==
This species is found in the Caribbean Sea and off the coast of Yucatan, Mexico.
