= Gerdiella santa =

Scientific classification
- Kingdom: Animalia
- Phylum: Mollusca
- Class: Gastropoda
- Subclass: Caenogastropoda
- Order: Neogastropoda
- Family: Cancellariidae
- Genus: Gerdiella
- Species: G. santa

Binomial name
- Gerdiella santa Olsson & Bayer, 1972

Synonyms
- Gerdiella santa Olsson & Bayer, 1972

Species of gastropod

Gerdiella santa is a species of sea snail, a marine gastropod mollusk in the family Cancellariidae, the nutmeg snails.
