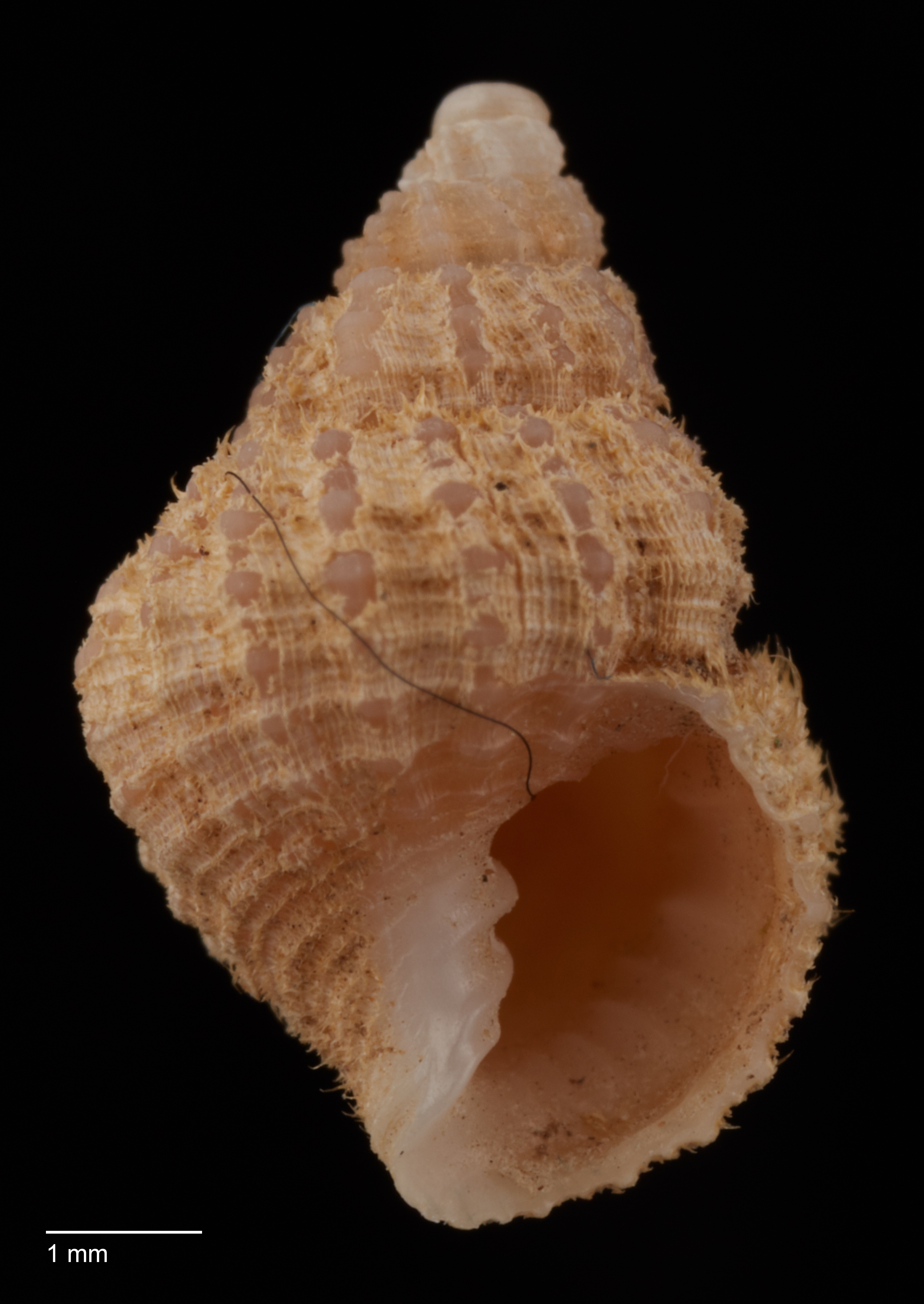
- Shell of Admetula garrardi (specimen at MNHN, Paris)

Scientific classification
- Kingdom: Animalia
- Phylum: Mollusca
- Class: Gastropoda
- Subclass: Caenogastropoda
- Order: Neogastropoda
- Family: Cancellariidae
- Genus: Admetula
- Species: A. garrardi

Binomial name
- Admetula garrardi Petit, 1974
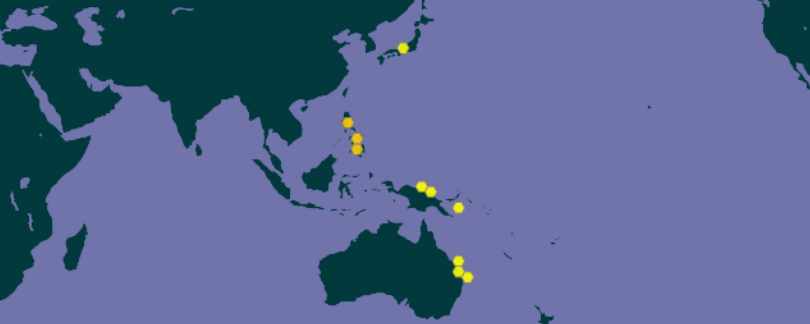

Synonyms
- Bonellitia garrardi (Petit, 1974); Neadmete nassoides Schepman, M.M., 1911; Cancellaria (Bonellitia) nassoides Schepman, 1911; Cancellaria (Merica) nassoides Schepman, 1911 (Invalid: junior homonym of Cancellaria nassoides Koenen, 1889; Admetula garrardi is a replacement name)

= Admetula garrardi =

Species of gastropod

Admetula garrardi is a species of sea snail, a marine gastropod mollusk in the family Cancellariidae, the nutmeg snails.

== Description ==
The shell size varies between 10mm and 17mm.

(Described as Cancellaria (Merica) nassoides) The dull brown, elongately-ovate shell is imperforate.

The spire is elongately-turreted. The shell contains 7½ convex whorls, separated by a very deep suture. The two apical whorls are smooth, while the subsequent whorls are adorned first with 3 robust, spiral lirae and thinner intermediate ones. There are four lirae on the penultimate whorl along with 6 intermediate ones, two of which lie near the suture. The lirae are crossed by more remote rounded ribs, having sometimes the appearance of varices, numbering seventeen on the body whorl, the lirae forming small nodules where they cross the ribs. Additionally the shell is covered with fine striae, crossing the lirae, lending them a subtle crenulated appearance. The small aperture is ovate. The outer lip is regularly arched, hosting seven short lirae spaced at a distance from the margin. The columellar margin is adorned with a thin, yellowish-white layer of enamel, which does not obscure the shell's sculpture. Three robust plaits adorn the columellar margin, with the upper ones exhibiting slight obliqueness and a perpendicular fold at approximately a right angle with the plaits. The basal plait is more oblique, and borders the large, shallow sinus. While lacking an umbilicus, the shell does possess an umbilical chink.

It was later discovered that the name Cancellaria nassoides had already been used by Koenen in 1889 for a different species.

== Distribution ==
This species is distributed in the Persian Gulf, Indonesia and the Western Pacific.
