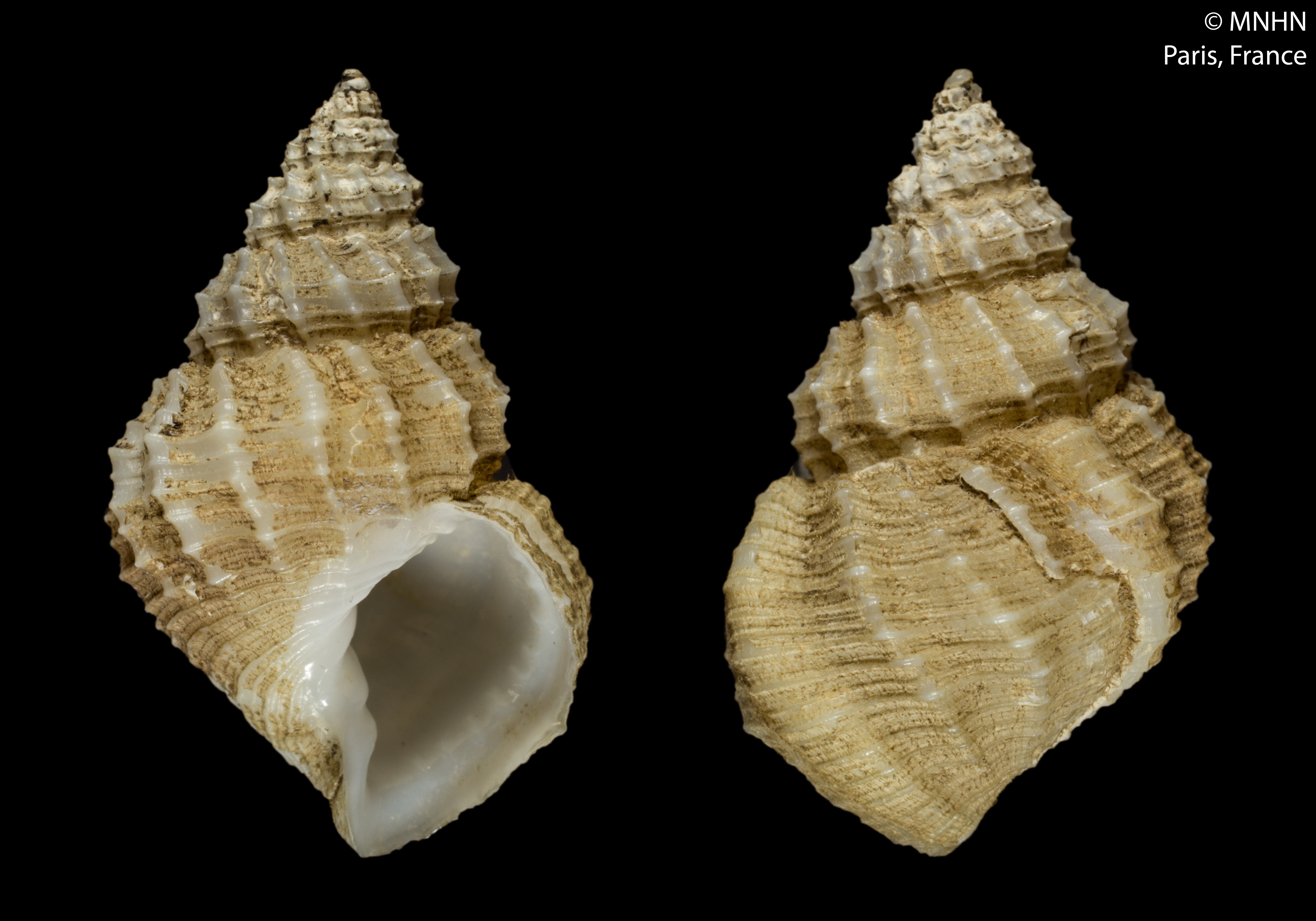
- Shell of Admetula atopodonta (holotype at MNHN, Paris)

Scientific classification
- Kingdom: Animalia
- Phylum: Mollusca
- Class: Gastropoda
- Subclass: Caenogastropoda
- Order: Neogastropoda
- Family: Cancellariidae
- Genus: Admetula
- Species: A. atopodonta

Binomial name
- Admetula atopodonta (Petit & Harasewych, 1986)
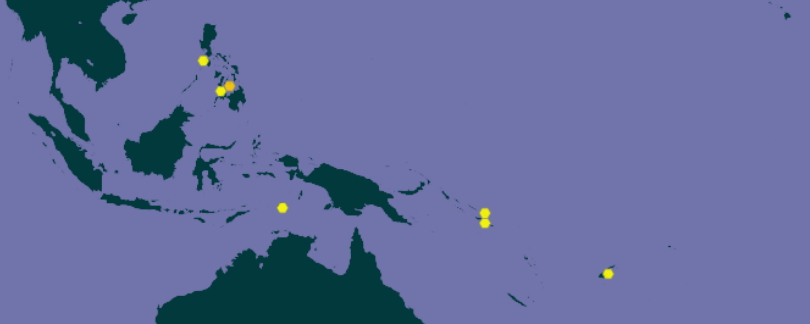

Synonyms
- Bonellitia atopodonta (Petit & Harasewych, 1986); Cancellaria atopodonta Petit & Harasewych, 1986 (basionym)

= Admetula atopodonta =

Species of gastropod

Admetula atopodonta is a species of sea snail, a marine gastropod mollusk in the family Cancellariidae, the nutmeg snails.

== Distribution ==
This marine species occurs off the Philippines and the Solomon Islands.
