= Admetula afra =

Scientific classification
- Kingdom: Animalia
- Phylum: Mollusca
- Class: Gastropoda
- Subclass: Caenogastropoda
- Order: Neogastropoda
- Family: Cancellariidae
- Genus: Admetula
- Species: A. afra

Binomial name
- Admetula afra Petit & Harasewych, 2000
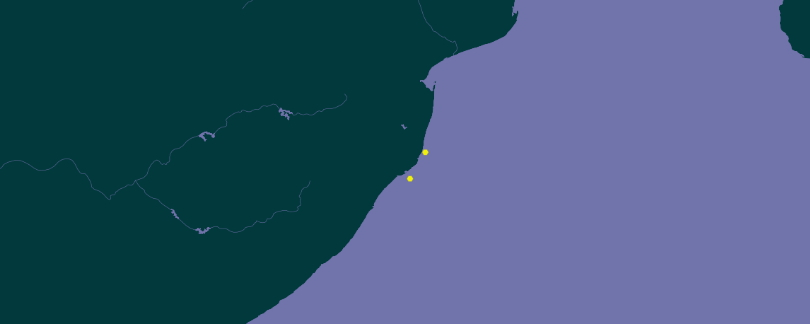

Synonyms
- Bonellitia afra (Petit & Harasewych, 2000)

Species of gastropod

Admetula afra is a species of sea snail, a marine gastropod mollusk in the family Cancellariidae, called the nutmeg snails.

The specific name afra is a feminine of afer, that means "African".

== Distribution ==
This marine species occurs off Natal, South Africa
