= Lira (mollusc) =

Sculptural feature of the outside of the shells of various animals

Lirae (singular lira) are a sculptural feature of the outside of the shells of various molluscs. An organism bearing lirae is "lirate". The feature was described by Leslie Reginald Cox in 1960 as a "fine linear elevation on shell surface or within outer lip" of gastropod shells. The term is also commonly applied to the shells of bivalves, nautiloids and brachiopods.
