= John Read le Brockton Tomlin =

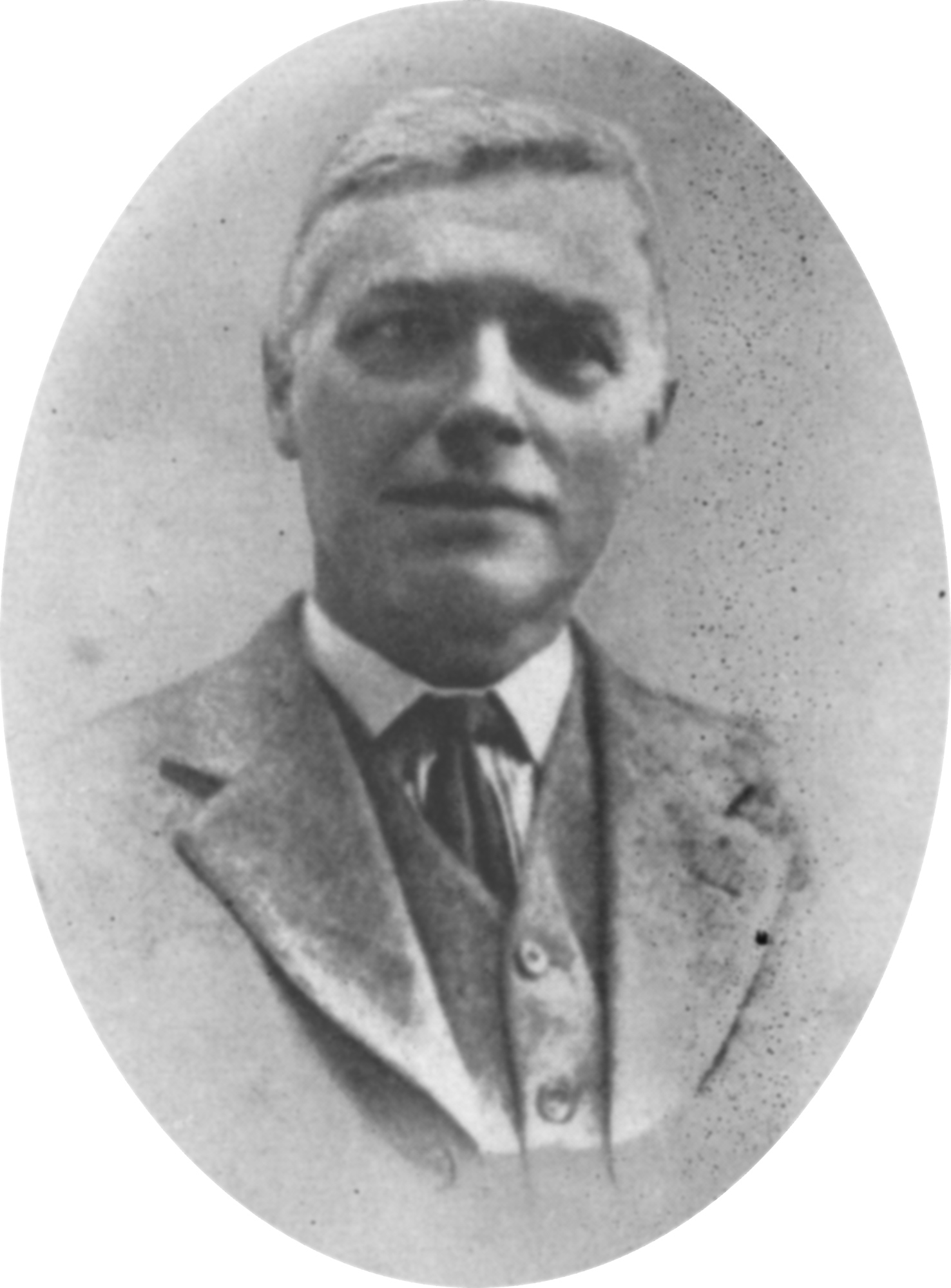
A photographic portrait of John Read le Brockton Tomlin

John Read le Brockton Tomlin (15 August 1864 – 24 December 1954) was a British malacologist. He was one of the founders of the Malacological Society of London and was president of the Conchological Society of Great Britain & Ireland on two separate occasions.

Tomlin named more than a hundred taxa of gastropod molluscs, including:

- The family Abyssochrysoidea Tomlin, 1927
- The family Columbariidae Tomlin, 1928

He also named some scaphopods and bivalves.
