= Volutoidea =

Volutoidea Temporal range: Cretaceous to Recent

Scientific classification
- Kingdom: Animalia
- Phylum: Mollusca
- Class: Gastropoda
- Subclass: Caenogastropoda
- Order: Neogastropoda
- Superfamily: Volutoidea; Rafinesque, 1815

Families
- See text

Synonyms
- Cancellarioidea Forbes & Hanley, 1851

Superfamily of sea snails

Volutoidea is a taxonomic superfamily of predatory sea snails, marine gastropod mollusks in the clade Neogastropoda.

This superfamily includes the chank snails, the dove snails, the volutes, the margin snails and others.

== Shell description ==
The shell of the snails in this superfamily vary greatly in shape and degree of ornamentation. The shells have an oval aperture, and a noticeable siphonal canal.

== Families ==
Families within the superfamily Volutoidea are as follows:

- family Cancellariidae Forbes & Hanley, 1851
- family Cystiscidae Stimpson, 1865 -- 15 genera
- family Granulinidae G. A. Coovert & H. K. Coovert, 1995
- family Marginellidae Fleming, 1828 -- 30 genera
- family Marginellonidae Coan, 1965
- family Volutidae Rafinesque, 1815 -- 49 genera

Synonyms

- Paladmetidae Stephenson, 1941 † synonym of Admetinae Troschel, 1865
- Plesiocystiscidae G. A. Coovert & H. K. Coovert, 1995: synonym of Plesiocystiscinae G. A. Coovert & H. K. Coovert, 1995
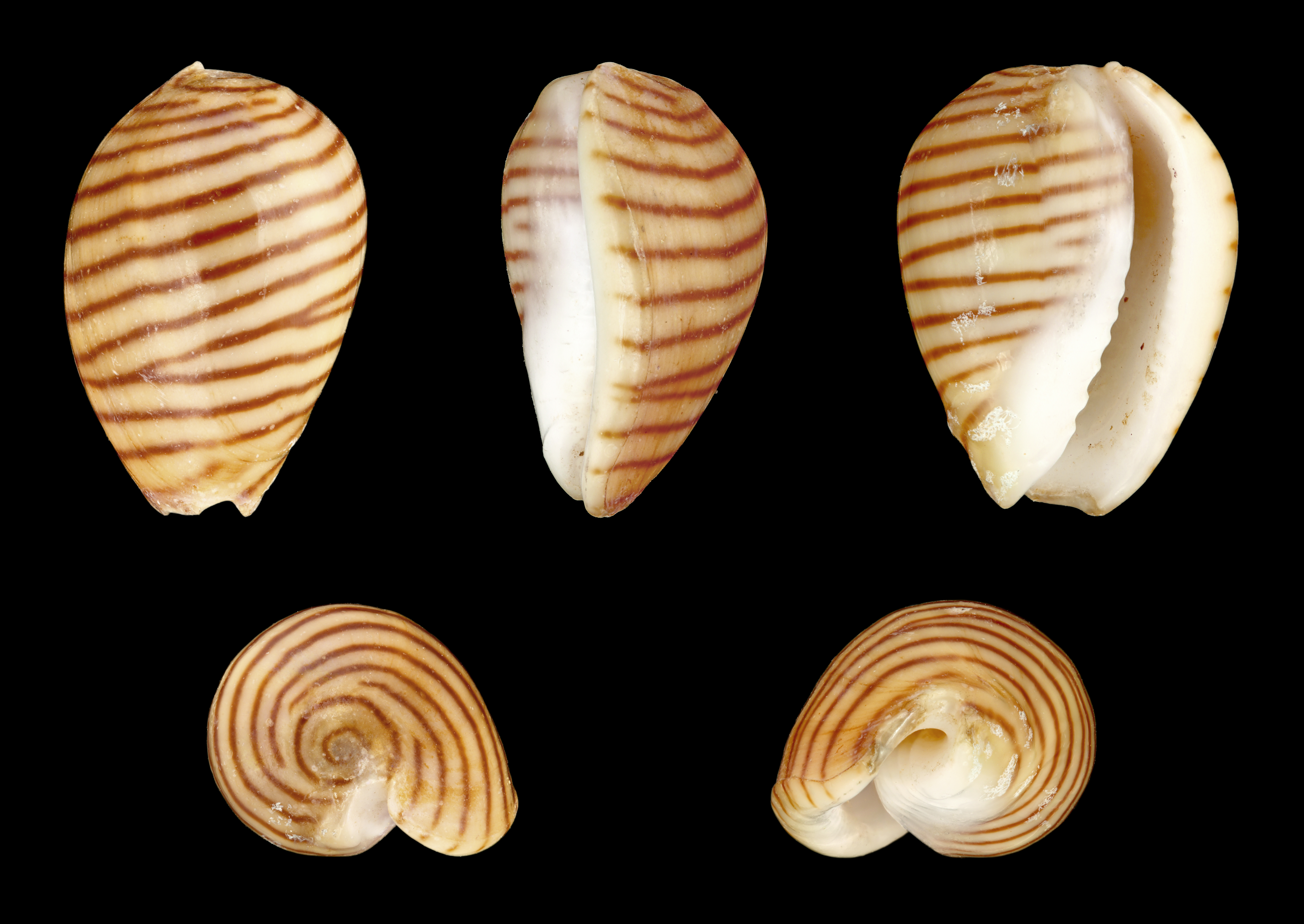
Persicula cingulata, Cystiscidae

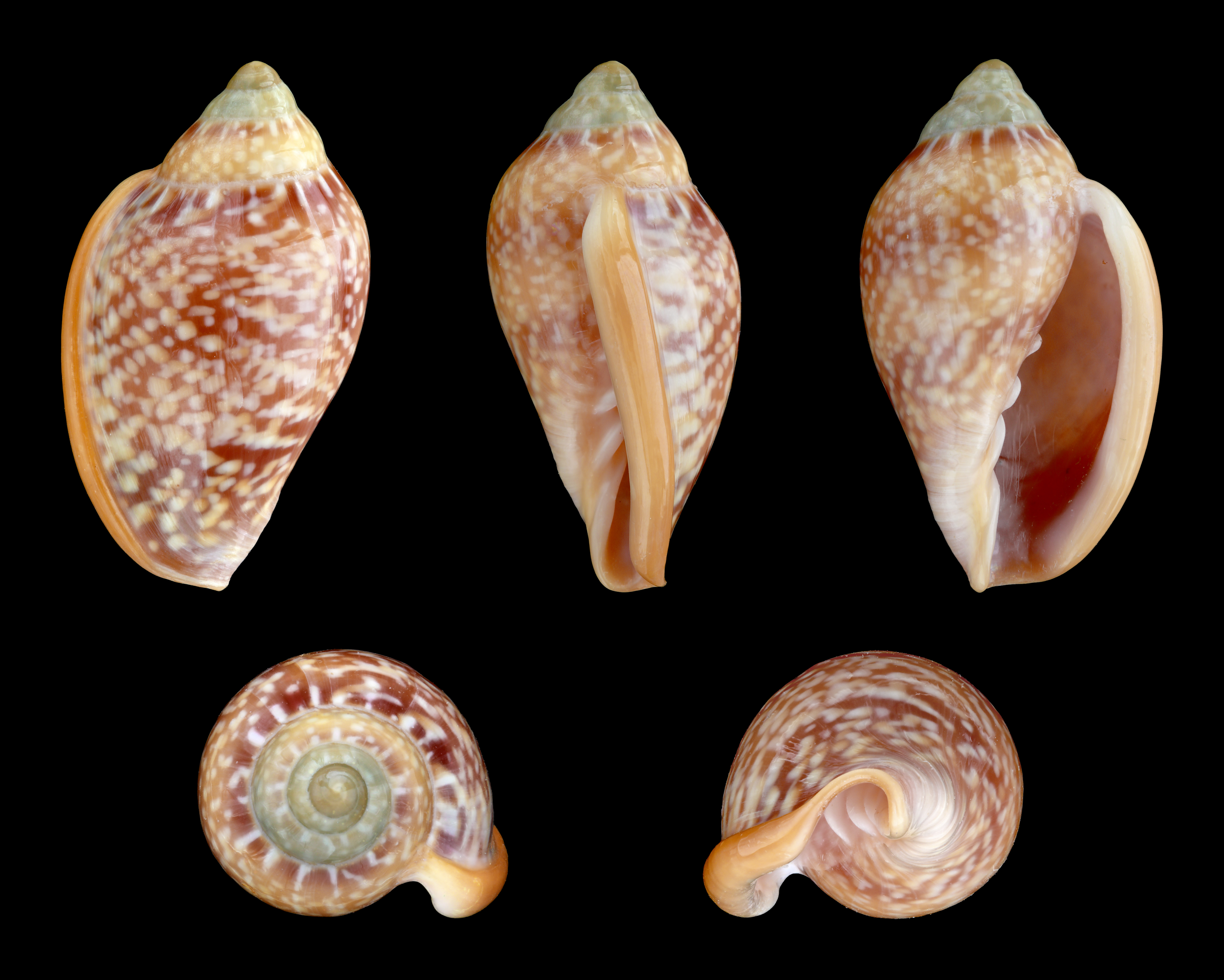
Marginella glabella, Marginellidae

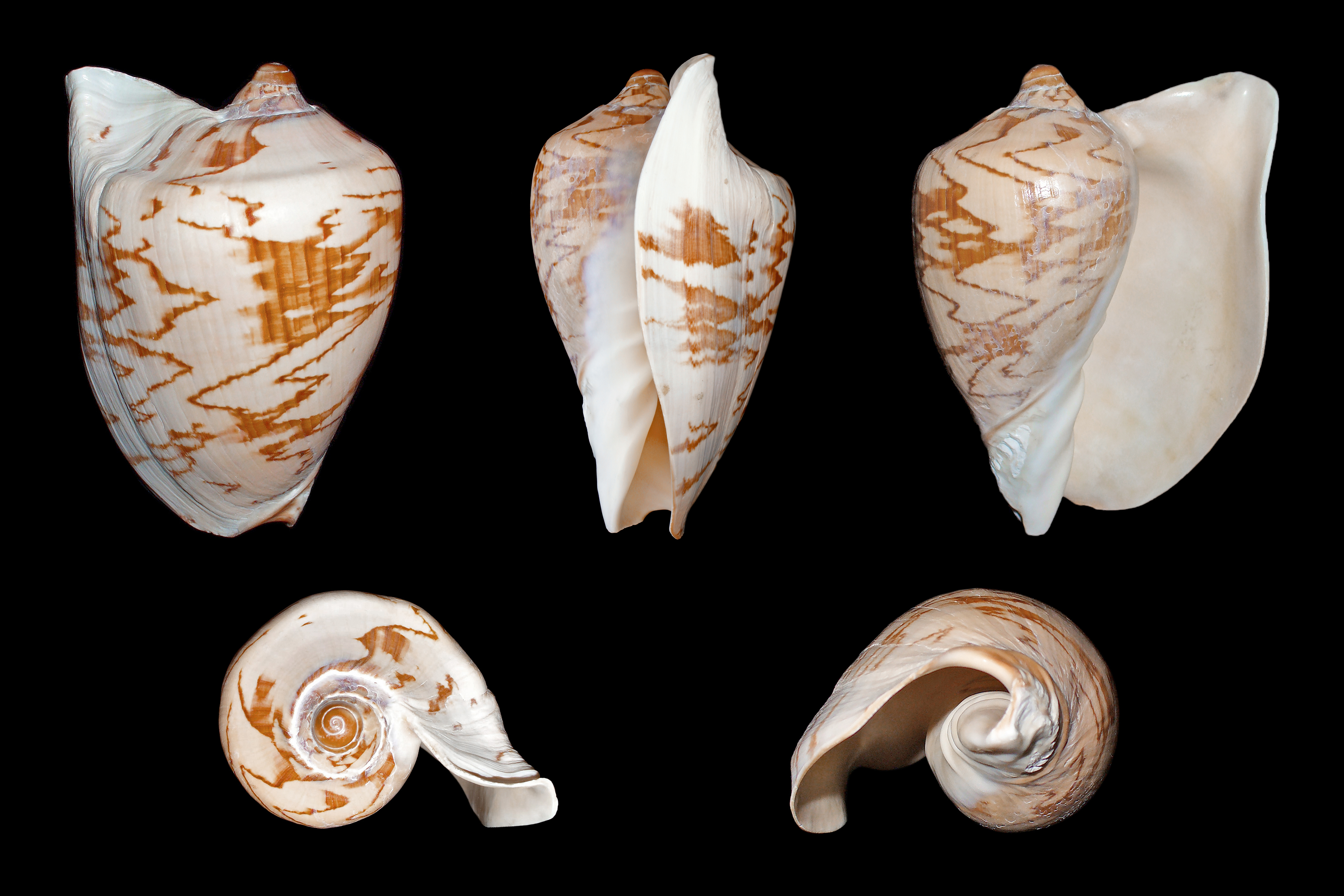
Cymbiola nobilis, Volutidae
