= R. Tucker Abbott =

American biologist (1919–1995)

- Born: September 28, 1919; Watertown, Massachusetts, U.S.
- Died: November 3, 1995 (aged 76); Lee County, Florida, U.S.
- Education: Harvard University and George Washington University
- Scientific career
- Fields: malacology conchology
- Workplaces: National Museum of Natural History, Academy of Natural Sciences, Delaware Museum of Natural History
- Doctoral advisor: William James Clench

Robert Tucker Abbott (September 28, 1919 – November 3, 1995) was an American conchologist and malacologist. He was the author of more than 30 books on malacology, which have been translated into many languages.

Abbott was one of the most prominent conchologists of the 20th century. He brought the study of seashells to the public with his works, including most notably: American Seashells (1954), Seashells of the World (1962), The Shell (1972), and The Kingdom of the Seashell (1972). He was an active member of the American Malacological Union and Conchologists of America.

== Biography ==
Tucker Abbott was born in Watertown, Massachusetts. His interest in seashells began early; he collected them as a boy and started a museum with a friend in his basement. After having spent part of his youth in Montreal, he went to Harvard University and became a student of William James Clench (1897–1984). In 1941, they started the journal Johnsonia, which specialized in western Atlantic molluscs. He graduated in 1942.

During World War II, Abbott was first a Navy bomber pilot, and later worked for the Medical Research Unit doing research on schistosomiasis. He documented the life cycle of the schistosome in Oncomelania, a small brown freshwater snail, which he studied in the rice fields of the Yangtze valley.

He married fellow malacologist Mary M. Sisler on February 18, 1946, and had three children, Robert Tucker, Jr., Carolyn Tucker and Cynthia Douglas.

After World War II, Abbott worked at the National Museum of Natural History, Smithsonian Institution (1944–1954) as Assistant Curator and Associate Curator of the Department of Mollusks. During this time, he earned his Master's and Ph.D. at George Washington University and wrote the first edition of American Seashells.

He then went to the Academy of Natural Sciences in Philadelphia (1954–1969). He was chair of the Department of Mollusks, and held the Pilsbry Chair of Malacology. During that time he went on a number of shelling expeditions to the Indo-Pacific region. He also started his own journal, "Indo-Pacific Mollusca". He also was an active editor of the journal "The Nautilus".

Abbott appeared as himself on the February 24, 1964 episode of the CBS gameshow To Tell the Truth, garnering two votes out of four from the panelists.

In 1969, Abbott accepted the DuPont Chair of Malacology at the Delaware Museum of Nature & Science. He also headed the Department of Mollusks, and was assistant director. In 1971 he became editor-in-chief of The Nautilus.

Abbott was the Founding Director of Bailey-Matthews National Shell Museum on Sanibel Island. He died from pulmonary disease at his Sanibel Island home, on November 3, 1995, two weeks before the museum opened. He is buried in Arlington National Cemetery.

== Taxa ==
=== Species named in his honor ===
A number of species were named in his honor (eponymous species):

- Armina abbotti Thompson, Cattaneo & Wong, 1990 (synonym of Armina wattla Ev. Marcus & Er. Marcus, 1967)
- Cassis abbotti Bouchet, 1988
- Chemnitzia abbotti Robba, Di Geronimo, Chaimanee, Negri & Sanfilippo, 2004
- Conus regius abbotti Clench, 1942 (now a synonym for Conus sphacelatus)
- Crenella abbotti Altena, 1968 (synonym of Crenella gemma Olsson & McGinty, 1958)
- Dolomena abbotti Dekkers & Liverani, 2011
- Latirus abbotti Snyder, 2003 (synonym of Polygona abbotti (Snyder, 2003))
- Miralda abbotti Olsson & McGinty, 1958
- Opalia abbotti Clench & Turner, 1952
- Odostomia abbotti Olsson & McGinty, 1958
- Plesiocystiscus abbotti (De Jong & Coomans, 1988)
- Polygona abbotti (Snyder, 2003)
- Pseudocyphoma abbotti (Cate, 1973) (synonym of Cyphoma intermedium (G.B. Sowerby I, 1828))
- Tonna galea abbotti Macsotay & Campos, 2001 (synonym of Tonna galea (Linnaeus, 1758))
- Volvarina abbotti de Jong & Coomans, 1988

=== Species named by him ===
Species named by Abbot include:

- Acteon eloiseae Abbott, 1973
- Chicoreus (Phyllonotus) margaritensis (Abbott, 1958) - originally described as Murex margaritensis Abbott, 1958
- Chicoreus (Triplex) cosmani Abbott & Finlay, 1979
- Transennella gerrardi Abbott, 1958 (family Veneridae)
- Tudivasum zanzibaricum (Abbott, 1958) - originally described as Tudicula zanzibarica Abbott, 1958

== Bibliography ==
- R. Tucker Abbott : Introducing Seashells, 1955
- R. Tucker Abbott: How to know American Marine Shells, 1961
- Abbott, Tucker (1962). Zim, Herbert S (ed.). Seashells of the World. Illustrated by George and Marita Sandstrom. Golden Guide. ISBN 1-58238-148-8.
- R. Tucker Abbott :Van Nostrand's Standard Catalog of shells, 1964
- Abbott, Tucker (1968). Zim, Herbert S (ed.). Seashells of North America, A Guide to Field Identification. Illustrated by George Sandstrom. Golden Field Guides. ISBN 0-307-13657-4.
- Abbott, Tucker; Stix, Hugh; Stix, Marguerite (1972). The Shell: Five Hundred Million Years of Inspired Design. Photographs by H. Landshoff. Abrams. ISBN 0-345-02689-6.
- Abbott, Tucker; Young, Mary Elizabeth (1973). American Malacologists: A national register of professional and amateur malacologists and private shell collectors and biographies of early American mollusk workers born between 1618 and 1900. Falls Church, Virginia: American Malacologists. ISBN 0-307-13657-4.
- Abbott, Tucker (1972). Kingdom of the Seashell. Crown Publishers.
- Abbott, R. Tucker, 1974, American Seashells, Second edition, Van Nostrand Rheinhold, New York, ISBN 0-442-20228-8.
- Abbott, Tucker; Morris, Percy A. (1995). A Field Guide to Shells of the Atlantic and Gulf Coasts and the West Indies. Illustrated by Roger Tory Peterson. Peterson Field Guide Series. ISBN 0-395-69779-4.
