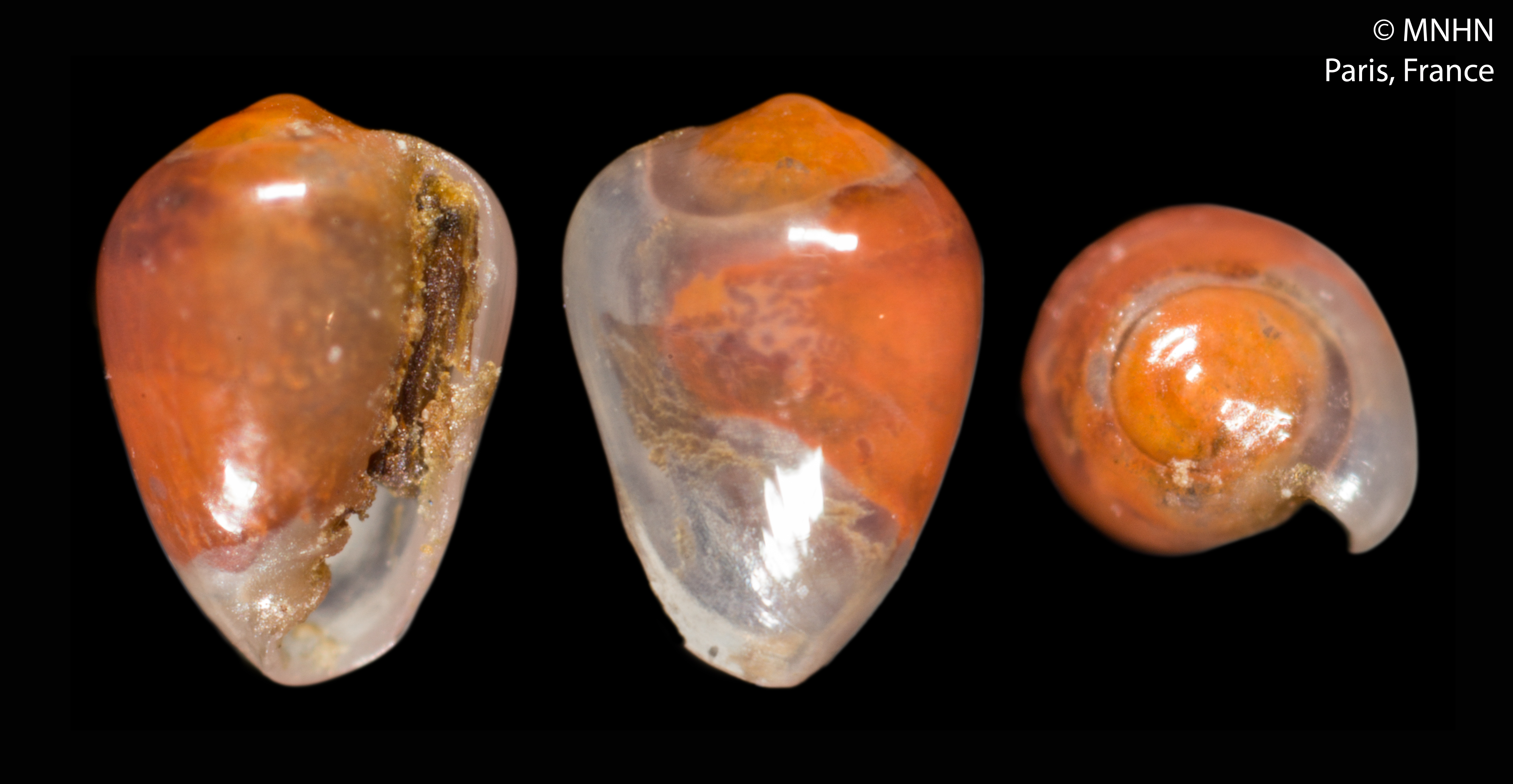
- Shell of Plesiocystiscus elzae (holotype at MNHN, Paris)

Scientific classification
- Kingdom: Animalia
- Phylum: Mollusca
- Class: Gastropoda
- Subclass: Caenogastropoda
- Order: Neogastropoda
- Family: Cystiscidae
- Subfamily: Plesiocystiscinae
- Genus: Plesiocystiscus
- Species: P. elzae

Binomial name
- Plesiocystiscus elzae Bozzetti, da Costa & T. Cossignani, 2010

= Plesiocystiscus elzae =

Species of gastropod

Plesiocystiscus elzae is a species of sea snail, a marine gastropod mollusk, in the family Cystiscidae.

== Description ==
The length of the shell attains 1.28 mm.

== Distribution ==
This marine species occurs off Mozambique.
