= Plesiocystiscus thalia =

Scientific classification
- Kingdom: Animalia
- Phylum: Mollusca
- Class: Gastropoda
- Subclass: Caenogastropoda
- Order: Neogastropoda
- Family: Cystiscidae
- Subfamily: Plesiocystiscinae
- Genus: Plesiocystiscus
- Species: P. thalia

Binomial name
- Plesiocystiscus thalia (W. H. Turton, 1932)

Synonyms
- Granulina thalia (W. H. Turton, 1932)

Species of gastropod

Plesiocystiscus thalia is a species of sea snail, a marine gastropod mollusk, in the family Cystiscidae.
