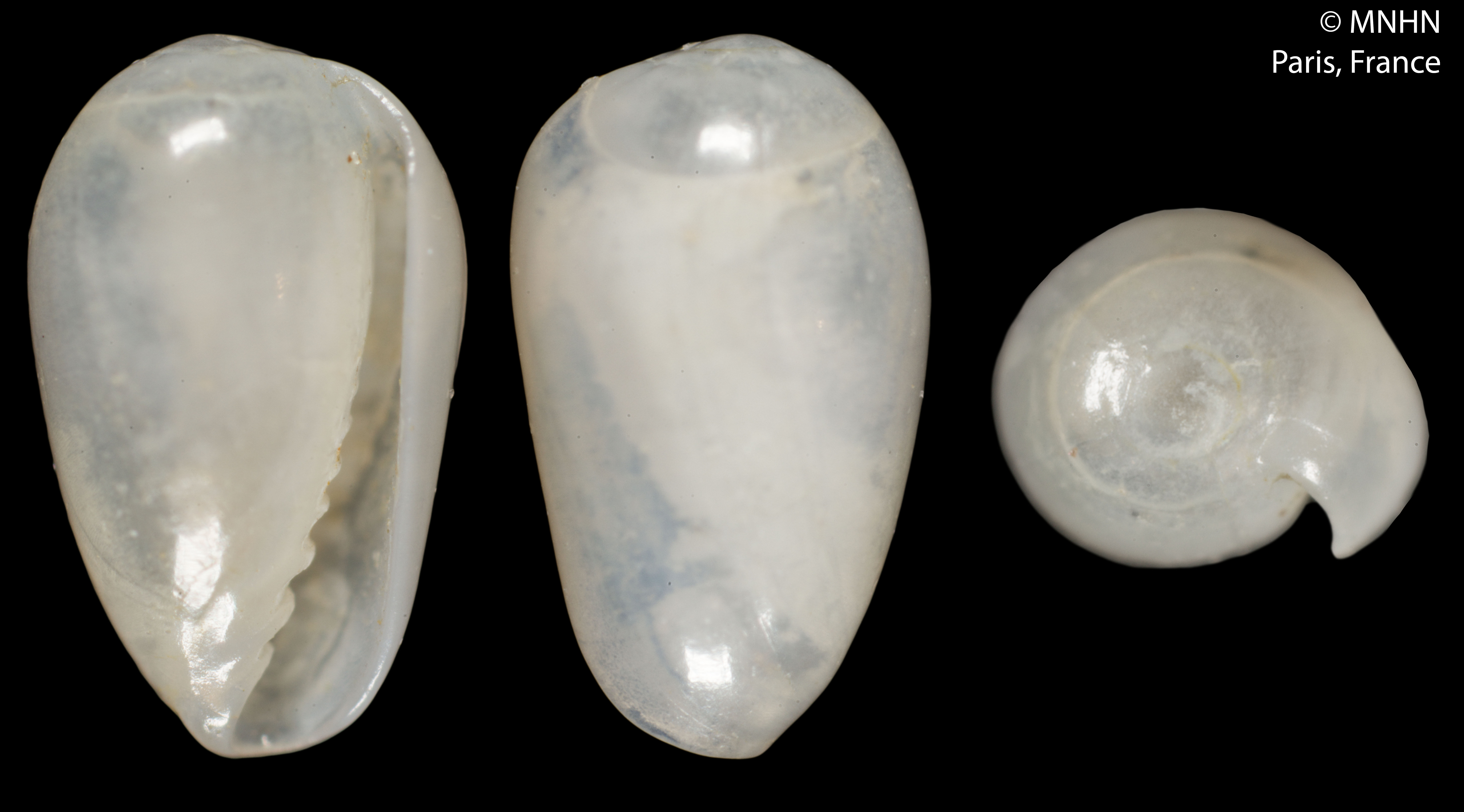
- Shell of Plesiocystiscus larva (syntype at MNHN, Paris)

Scientific classification
- Kingdom: Animalia
- Phylum: Mollusca
- Class: Gastropoda
- Subclass: Caenogastropoda
- Order: Neogastropoda
- Family: Cystiscidae
- Subfamily: Plesiocystiscinae
- Genus: Plesiocystiscus
- Species: P. larva

Binomial name
- Plesiocystiscus larva (Bavay, 1922)

Synonyms
- Gibberula bocasensis Olsson & McGinty, 1958; Marginella larva Bavay, 1922; Plesiocystiscus bocasensis (Olsson & McGinty, 1958)

= Plesiocystiscus larva =

Species of gastropod

Plesiocystiscus larva is a species of sea snail, a marine gastropod mollusk, in the family Cystiscidae.

== Distribution ==
This marine species occurs off Colón (Panama)
