= Plesiocystiscus palantirulus =

Scientific classification
- Kingdom: Animalia
- Phylum: Mollusca
- Class: Gastropoda
- Subclass: Caenogastropoda
- Order: Neogastropoda
- Family: Cystiscidae
- Subfamily: Plesiocystiscinae
- Genus: Plesiocystiscus
- Species: P. palantirulus

Binomial name
- Plesiocystiscus palantirulus (Roth & Coan, 1968)

Synonyms
- Cystiscus palantirulus Roth & Coan, 1968

Species of gastropod

Plesiocystiscus palantirulus is a species of sea snail, a marine gastropod mollusk, in the family Cystiscidae.
