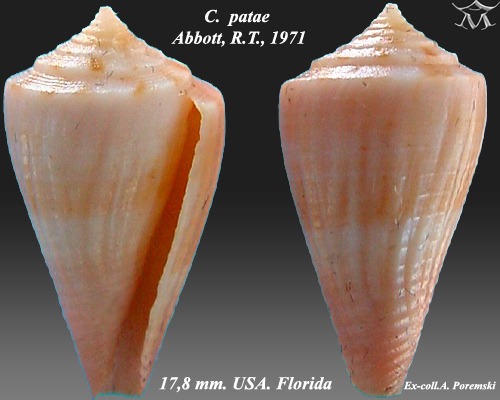
- Apertural and abapertural views of shell of Conus patae Abbott, R.T., 1971
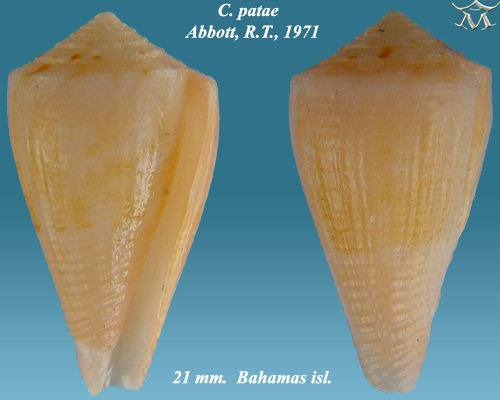

Conservation status
- Least Concern (IUCN 3.1)

Scientific classification
- Kingdom: Animalia
- Phylum: Mollusca
- Class: Gastropoda
- Subclass: Caenogastropoda
- Order: Neogastropoda
- Superfamily: Conoidea
- Family: Conidae
- Genus: Conus
- Species: C. patae

Binomial name
- Conus patae Abbott, 1971

Synonyms
- Conus (Kellyconus) patae Abbott, 1971 · accepted, alternate representation; Conus rudiae Magnotte, 1971; Gladioconus patae (Abbott, 1971); Kellyconus patae (Abbott, 1971)

= Conus patae =

Species of sea snail

Conus patae, common name Pat's cone, is a species of sea snail, a marine gastropod mollusk in the family Conidae, the cone snails and their allies.

Like all species within the genus Conus, these snails are predatory and venomous. They are capable of stinging humans, therefore live ones should be handled carefully or not at all.

== Distribution ==
This species occurs in the Caribbean Sea and in the Gulf of Mexico, from East Florida to Jamaica, and at Barbados.

== Description ==
The maximum recorded shell length is 28 mm.

== Habitat ==
Minimum recorded depth is 9 m. Maximum recorded depth is 61 m.
