= Plesiocystiscus consanguineus =

Scientific classification
- Kingdom: Animalia
- Phylum: Mollusca
- Class: Gastropoda
- Subclass: Caenogastropoda
- Order: Neogastropoda
- Family: Cystiscidae
- Subfamily: Plesiocystiscinae
- Genus: Plesiocystiscus
- Species: P. consanguineus

Binomial name
- Plesiocystiscus consanguineus (E. A. Smith, 1890)

Synonyms
- Marginella (Volvaria) consanguinea E. A. Smith, 1890

Species of gastropod

Plesiocystiscus consanguineus is a species of sea snail, a marine gastropod mollusk, in the family Cystiscidae.
