= Plesiocystiscus aphanospira =

Scientific classification
- Kingdom: Animalia
- Phylum: Mollusca
- Class: Gastropoda
- Subclass: Caenogastropoda
- Order: Neogastropoda
- Family: Cystiscidae
- Subfamily: Plesiocystiscinae
- Genus: Plesiocystiscus
- Species: P. aphanospira

Binomial name
- Plesiocystiscus aphanospira (Tomlin, 1913)

Synonyms
- Cystiscus aphanospira (Tomlin, 1913); Cystiscus nigrocrocea (Barnard, 1969); Granulina aphanospira (Tomlin, 1913); Marginella aphanospira Tomlin, 1913; Marginella hera W. Turton, 1932; Marginella nigrocrocea Barnard, 1969; Persicula nigrocrocea Barnard, 1969

Species of gastropod

Plesiocystiscus aphanospira is a species of sea snail, a marine gastropod mollusk, in the family Cystiscidae.
