= Plesiocystiscus politulus =

Scientific classification
- Kingdom: Animalia
- Phylum: Mollusca
- Class: Gastropoda
- Subclass: Caenogastropoda
- Order: Neogastropoda
- Family: Cystiscidae
- Subfamily: Plesiocystiscinae
- Genus: Plesiocystiscus
- Species: P. politulus

Binomial name
- Plesiocystiscus politulus (Dall, 1919)

Species of sea snail

Plesiocystiscus politulus is a species of sea snail, a marine gastropod mollusk, in the family Cystiscidae.
