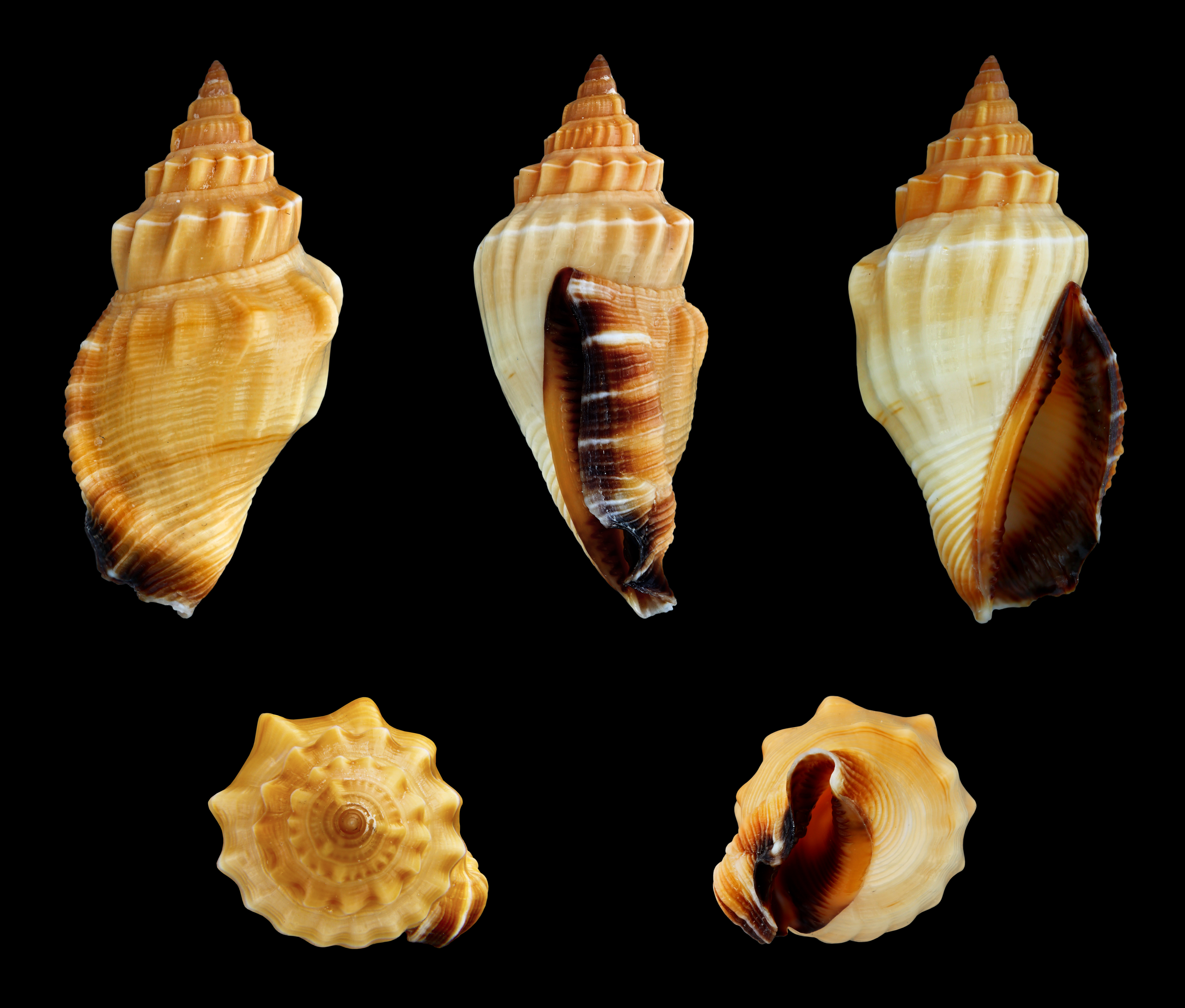
- Five views of a shell of Canarium erythrinum
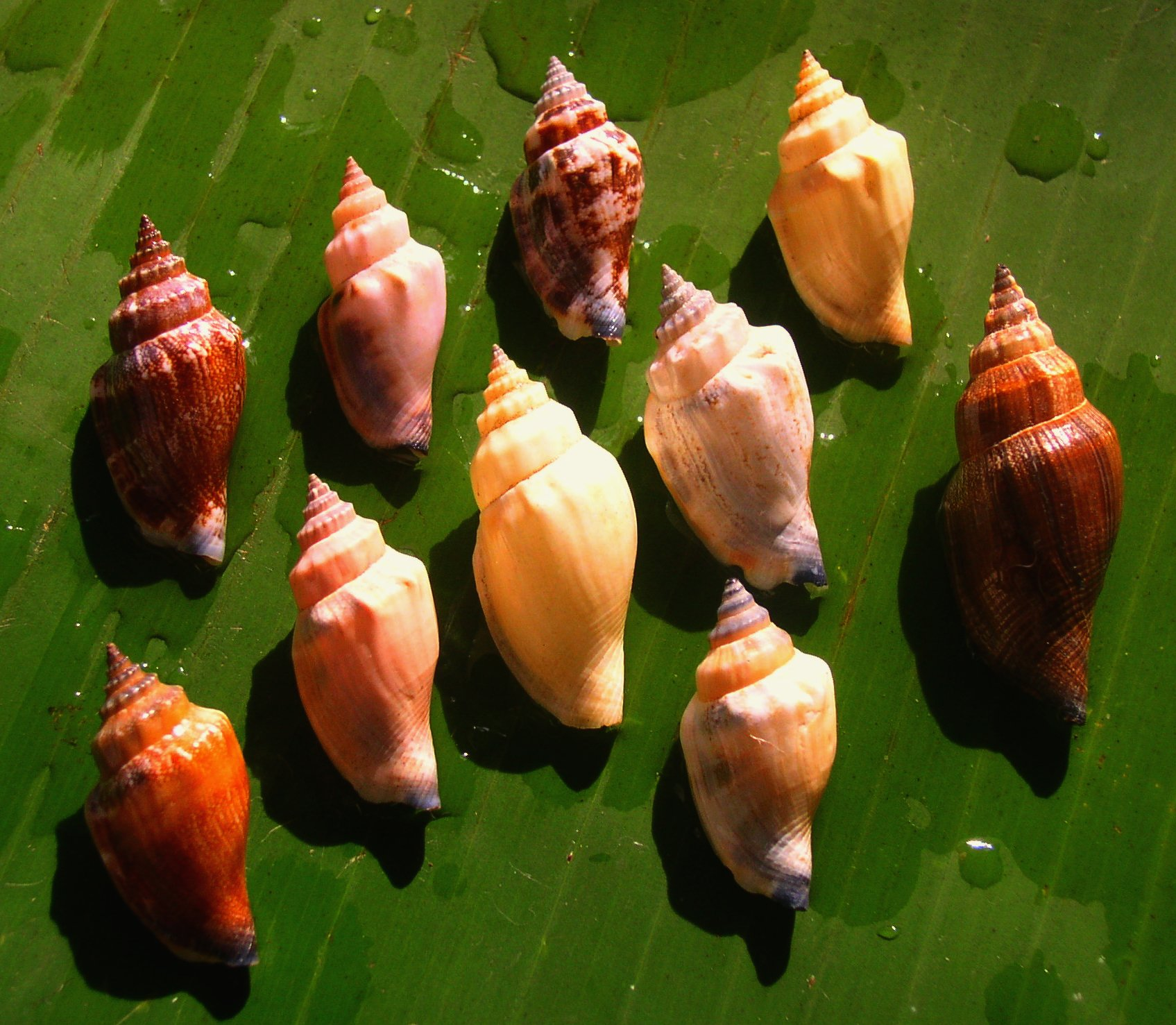
- A variety of live Canarium sp.

Scientific classification
- Kingdom: Animalia
- Phylum: Mollusca
- Class: Gastropoda
- Subclass: Caenogastropoda
- Order: Littorinimorpha
- Superfamily: Stromboidea
- Family: Strombidae
- Genus: Canarium; Schumacher, 1817

Type species
- Canarium urceus urceus f. ustulatus Schumacher, 1817

Species
- See text

Synonyms
- Canarium (Canarium) Schumacher, 1817 ·alternative representation; Canarium (Elegantum) Liverani, Dekkers & S. J. Maxwell, 2021 alternative representation; Canarium (Hawaiistrombus) Bandel, 2007 alternative representation; Canarium (Stereostrombus) Liverani, Dekkers & S. J. Maxwell, 2021 junior subjective synonym; Strombidea Swainson, 1840 junior subjective synonym; Strombus (Canarium) Schumacher, 1817 superseded rank

= Canarium (gastropod) =

Genus of gastropods

Canarium is a genus of sea snails, marine gastropod mollusks in the family Strombidae, the true conchs.

== General characteristics ==
(Original description in Latin) The shell is oblong, with an elevated, pointed spire. The aperture is linear and complete posteriorly, becoming narrowed toward the front. The siphonal canal is short and slightly bent away from the aperture; it is open. The outer lip is thickened and has a sharp margin. Anteriorly, it bears a semilunar lobe between the sinus and the oblique cut of the canal; posteriorly, it is complete. The inner surface of the outer lip is slightly striated. The inner lip is callused and adherent, while the columella is twisted and slightly striated anteriorly.

Note on “apertura postice integerrima”: This phrase most likely means that the posterior canal is absent—that is, the posterior end of the aperture is entire, without a notch or canal. The same character is repeated in the description of the outer lip: “labium externum … postice integerrimum” (“the outer lip … entirely entire posteriorly”).

== Species ==
Species within the genus Canarium include:

- Canarium anatellum (Duclos, 1844)
- Canarium andamanense Dekkers, H. Dekker & S. J. Maxwell, 2022
- Canarium darwinense S. J. Maxwell & Dekkers, 2021
- Canarium daveyi Dekkers & S. J. Maxwell, 2020
- Canarium elegans (G. B. Sowerby II, 1842)
- Canarium erythrinum (Dillwyn, 1817)
- Canarium esculentum S. J. Maxwell, Rymer, Congdon & Dekkers, 2020
- Canarium geelvinkbaaiense Dekkers & S. J. Maxwell, 2020
- † Canarium gendinganensis (K. Martin, 1899)
- † Canarium ickeae (Beets, 1987)
- Canarium incisum (W. Wood, 1828)
- Canarium labiatum (Röding, 1798)
- Canarium manintveldi Dekkers & S. J. Maxwell, 2020
- Canarium nipponium S. J. Maxwell & Dekkers, 2021
- Canarium olydium (Duclos, 1844)
- Canarium orrae (Abbott, 1960)
- Canarium radians (Duclos, 1844)
- † Canarium rembangense (K. Martin, 1899)
- Canarium rugosum (Sowerby I, 1825)
- † Canarium spolongense (K. Martin, 1916)
- † Canarium stoutjesdijki Dekkers, 2022
- † Canarium unifasciatum (K. Martin, 1884)
- Canarium urceus (Linnaeus, 1758)
- Canarium wilsonorum (Abbott, 1967)
- Canarium youngorum Dekkers & S. J. Maxwell, 2020

== Synonyms ==
- Canarium betuleti (Kronenberg, 1991): synonym of Maculastrombus betuleti (Kronenberg, 1991) (superseded combination)
- Canarium fusiforme (Sowerby II, 1842): synonym of Fusistrombus fusiformis (G. B. Sowerby II, 1842) (superseded combination)
- Canarium haemastoma (Sowerby II, 1842): synonym of Canarium scalariforme (Duclos, 1833)
- Canarium hellii (Kiener, 1843): synonym of Hawaiistrombus hellii (Kiener, 1843) (superseded combination)
- Canarium klineorum (Abbott, 1960): synonym of Maculastrombus klineorum (Abbott, 1960) (superseded combination)
- Canarium maculatum (Sowerby II, 1842): synonym of Maculastrombus maculatus (G. B. Sowerby II, 1842)
- Canarium microurceus Kira, 1959: synonym of Maculastrombus microurceus (Kira, 1959) (superseded combination)
- Canarium mutabile (Swainson, 1821): synonym of Maculastrombus mutabilis (Swainson, 1821) ( superseded combination)
- Canarium ochroglottis (Abbott, 1960): synonym of Maculastrombus ochroglottis (Abbott, 1960) (superseded combination)
- Canarium otiolum Iredale, 1931: synonym of Canarium labiatum (Röding, 1798)
- Canarium scalariforme (Duclos, 1833): synonym of Hawaiistrombus scalariformis (Duclos, 1833) (superseded combination)
- Canarium ustulatum Schumacher, 1817: synonym of Canarium urceus urceus (Linnaeus, 1758)
