= Plesiocystiscus mariae =

Scientific classification
- Kingdom: Animalia
- Phylum: Mollusca
- Class: Gastropoda
- Subclass: Caenogastropoda
- Order: Neogastropoda
- Family: Cystiscidae
- Subfamily: Plesiocystiscinae
- Genus: Plesiocystiscus
- Species: P. mariae

Binomial name
- Plesiocystiscus mariae (Espinosa & Ortea, 2014)

Synonyms
- Intelcystiscus mariae Espinosa & Ortea, 2014

Species of gastropod

Plesiocystiscus mariae is a species of sea snail, a marine gastropod mollusk, in the family Cystiscidae.
