= Plesiocystiscus jardonae =

Scientific classification
- Kingdom: Animalia
- Phylum: Mollusca
- Class: Gastropoda
- Subclass: Caenogastropoda
- Order: Neogastropoda
- Family: Cystiscidae
- Subfamily: Plesiocystiscinae
- Genus: Plesiocystiscus
- Species: P. jardonae

Binomial name
- Plesiocystiscus jardonae Ortea & Espinosa, 2016

Species of gastropod

Plesiocystiscus jardonae is a species of sea snail, a marine gastropod mollusk, in the family Cystiscidae.

== Distribution ==
This species occurs in Guadeloupe.
