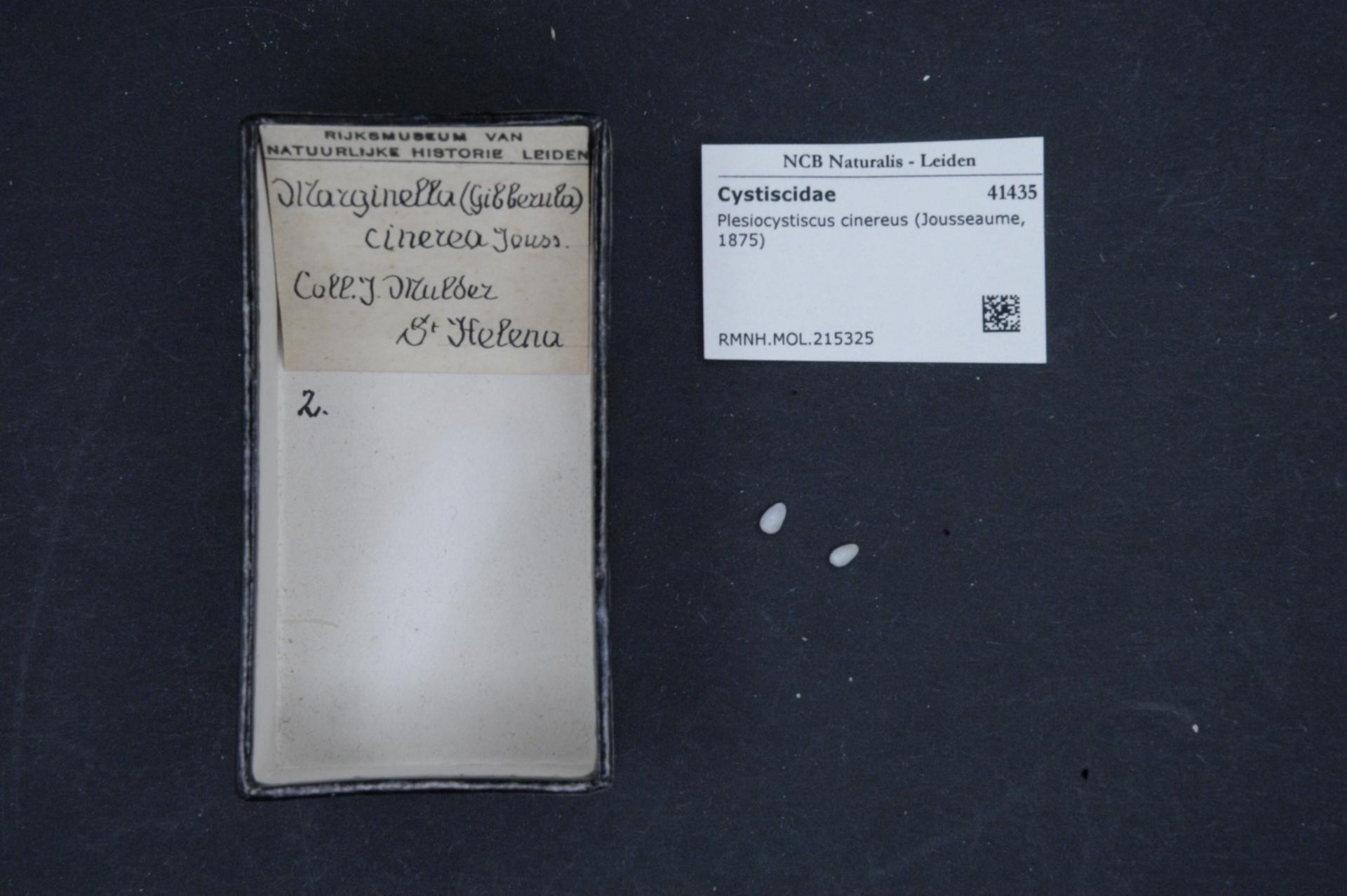
- Plesiocystiscus cinereus

Scientific classification
- Kingdom: Animalia
- Phylum: Mollusca
- Class: Gastropoda
- Subclass: Caenogastropoda
- Order: Neogastropoda
- Family: Cystiscidae
- Subfamily: Plesiocystiscinae
- Genus: Plesiocystiscus
- Species: P. cinereus

Binomial name
- Plesiocystiscus cinereus (Jousseaume, 1875)

= Plesiocystiscus cinereus =

Species of gastropod

Plesiocystiscus cinereus is a species of sea snail, a marine gastropod mollusk, in the family Cystiscidae.
