= Canarium radians =

- Shell of Canarium radians (original image)

Scientific classification
- Kingdom: Animalia
- Phylum: Mollusca
- Class: Gastropoda
- Subclass: Caenogastropoda
- Order: Littorinimorpha
- Family: Strombidae
- Genus: Canarium
- Species: C. radians

Binomial name
- Canarium radians (Duclos, 1844)

Synonyms
- Canarium (Elegantum) radians (Duclos, 1844) alternative representation; Strombus radians Duclos, 1844 (original combination)

Species of gastropod

Canarium radians is a species of sea snail, a marine gastropod mollusc in the family Strombidae, the true conchs.

== Distribution ==
This marine species occurs off New Caledonia, Papua New Guinea and Vanuatu.
