= Polygona lactea =

Scientific classification
- Kingdom: Animalia
- Phylum: Mollusca
- Class: Gastropoda
- Subclass: Caenogastropoda
- Order: Neogastropoda
- Family: Fasciolariidae
- Genus: Polygona
- Species: P. lactea

Binomial name
- Polygona lactea (Matthews-Cascou, Matthews & Rocha, 1991)

Synonyms
- Latirus lacteus Matthews-Cascou, Matthews & Rocha, 1991

Species of gastropod

Polygona lactea is a species of sea snail, a marine gastropod mollusk in the family Fasciolariidae, the spindle snails, the tulip snails and their allies.
