= Canarium anatellum =

- Shell of Canarium anatellum

Scientific classification
- Kingdom: Animalia
- Phylum: Mollusca
- Class: Gastropoda
- Subclass: Caenogastropoda
- Order: Littorinimorpha
- Family: Strombidae
- Genus: Canarium
- Species: C. anatellum

Binomial name
- Canarium anatellum (Duclos, 1844)

Synonyms
- Strombus anatellus Duclos, 1844 (original combination)

Species of gastropod

Canarium anatellum is a species of sea snail, a marine gastropod mollusc in the family Strombidae, the true conchs.

== Description ==
The shell attains a length of 41 mm.

== Distribution ==
This marine species occurs in the Java Sea, Indonesia.
