= Polygona vermeiji =

Scientific classification
- Kingdom: Animalia
- Phylum: Mollusca
- Class: Gastropoda
- Subclass: Caenogastropoda
- Order: Neogastropoda
- Family: Fasciolariidae
- Genus: Polygona
- Species: P. vermeiji

Binomial name
- Polygona vermeiji (Petuch, 1986)

Synonyms
- Latirus vermeiji Petuch, 1986

Species of gastropod

Polygona vermeiji is a species of sea snail, a marine gastropod mollusk in the family Fasciolariidae, the spindle snails, the tulip snails and their allies.
