= Polygona concentrica =

Scientific classification
- Kingdom: Animalia
- Phylum: Mollusca
- Class: Gastropoda
- Subclass: Caenogastropoda
- Order: Neogastropoda
- Family: Fasciolariidae
- Genus: Polygona
- Species: P. concentrica

Binomial name
- Polygona concentrica (Reeve, 1847)

Synonyms
- Turbinella concentrica Reeve, 1847; Latirus concentricus (Reeve, 1847)

Species of gastropod

Polygona concentrica is a species of sea snail, a marine gastropod mollusk in the family Fasciolariidae, the spindle snails, the tulip snails and their allies.
