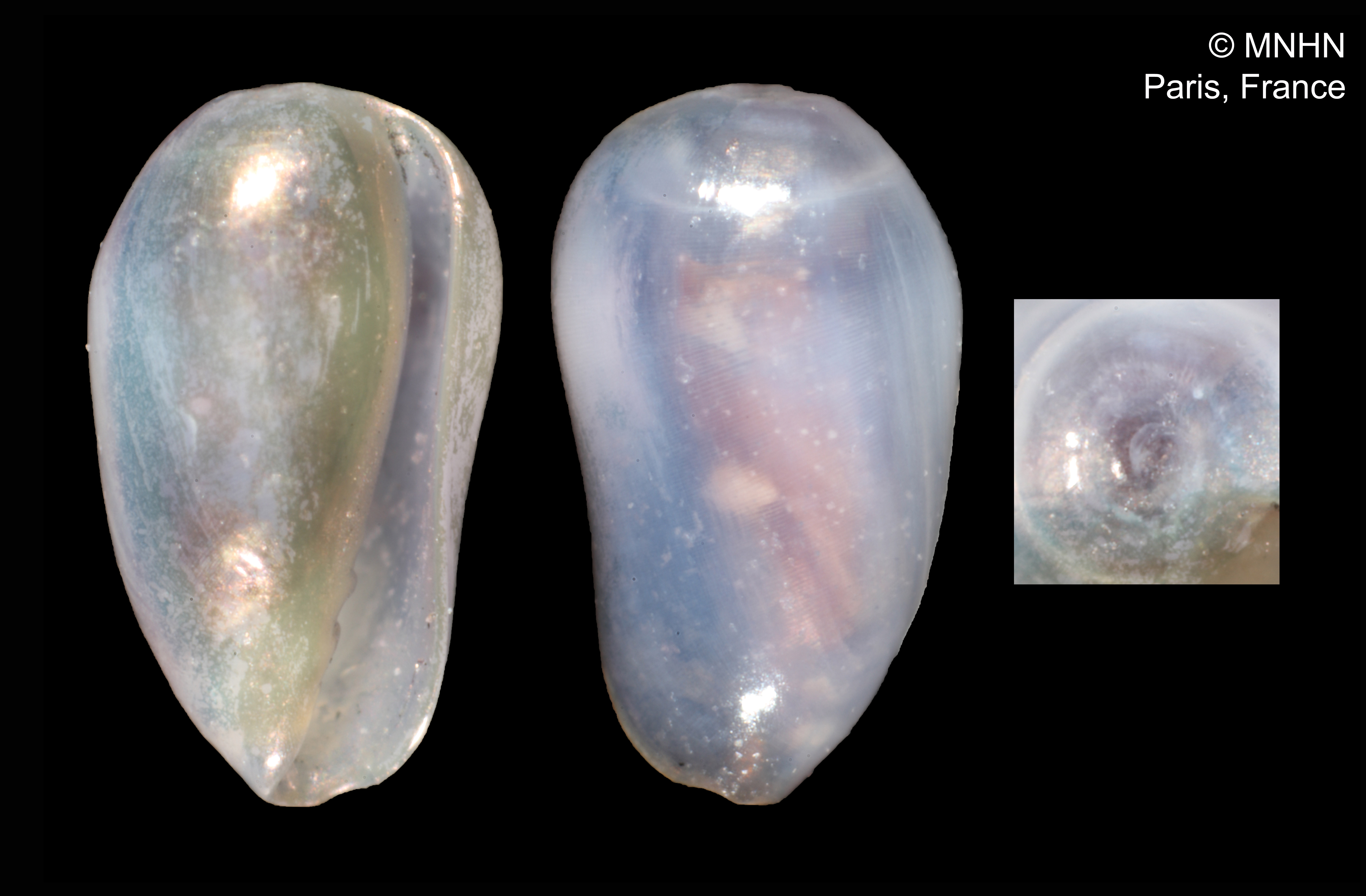
- Shell of Plesiocystiscus violaceus (holotype at MNHN, Paris)

Scientific classification
- Kingdom: Animalia
- Phylum: Mollusca
- Class: Gastropoda
- Subclass: Caenogastropoda
- Order: Neogastropoda
- Family: Cystiscidae
- Genus: Plesiocystiscus
- Species: P. violaceous

Binomial name
- Plesiocystiscus violaceous Rolán & Gori, 2014

= Plesiocystiscus violaceus =

Species of gastropod

Plesiocystiscus violaceous is a species of very small sea snail, a marine gastropod mollusc or micromollusk in the family Cystiscidae.

== Description ==
The length of the shell attains 2.6 mm.

== Distribution ==
The species is endemic to São Tomé and Príncipe.
