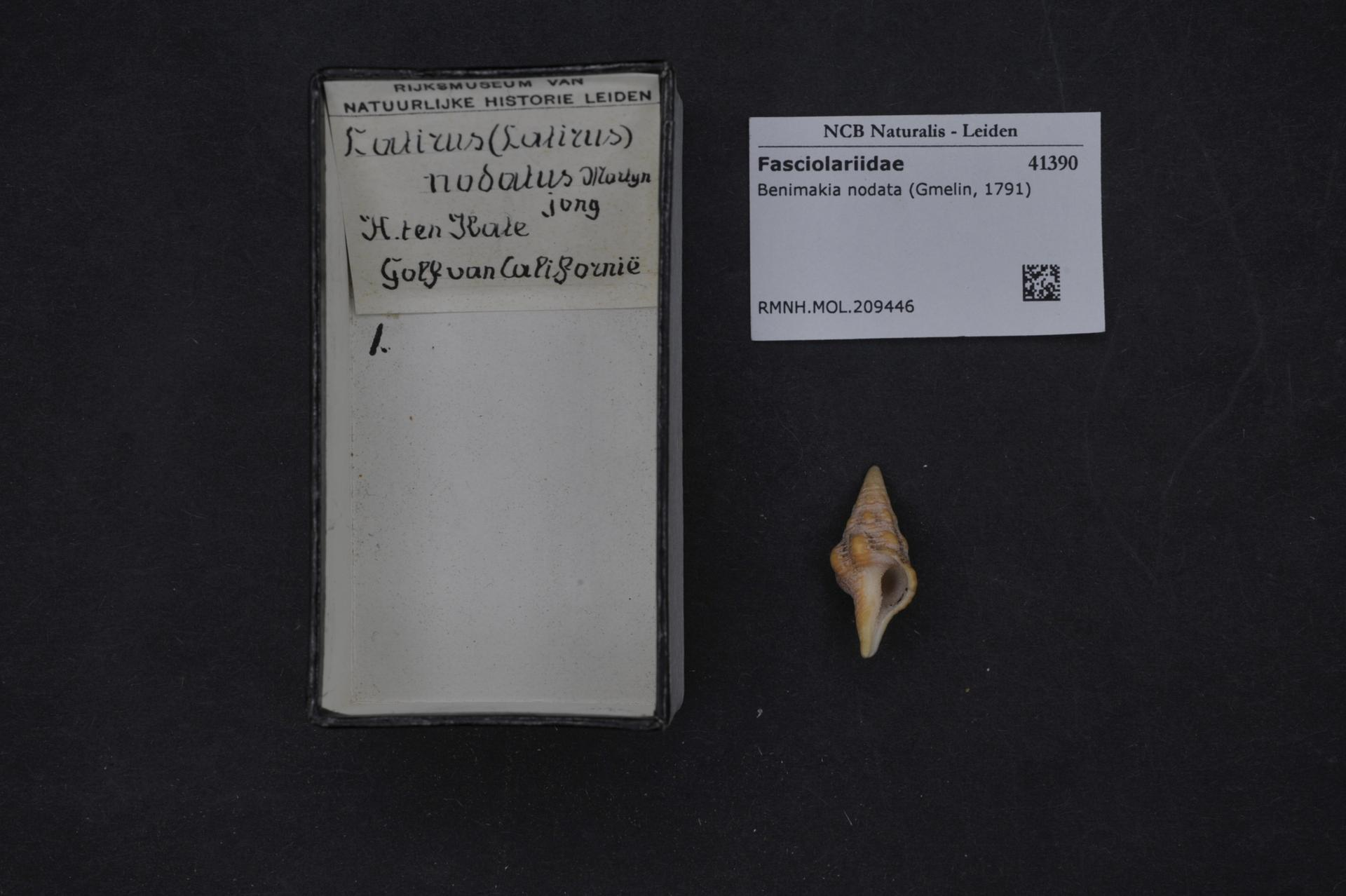

Scientific classification
- Kingdom: Animalia
- Phylum: Mollusca
- Class: Gastropoda
- Subclass: Caenogastropoda
- Order: Neogastropoda
- Family: Fasciolariidae
- Genus: Polygona
- Species: P. socorroensis

Binomial name
- Polygona socorroensis (Hertlein & Strong, 1951à

Synonyms
- Latirus socorroensis Hertlein & Strong, 1951

= Polygona socorroensis =

Species of gastropod

Polygona socorroensis is a species of sea snail, a marine gastropod mollusk in the family Fasciolariidae, the spindle snails, the tulip snails and their allies.
