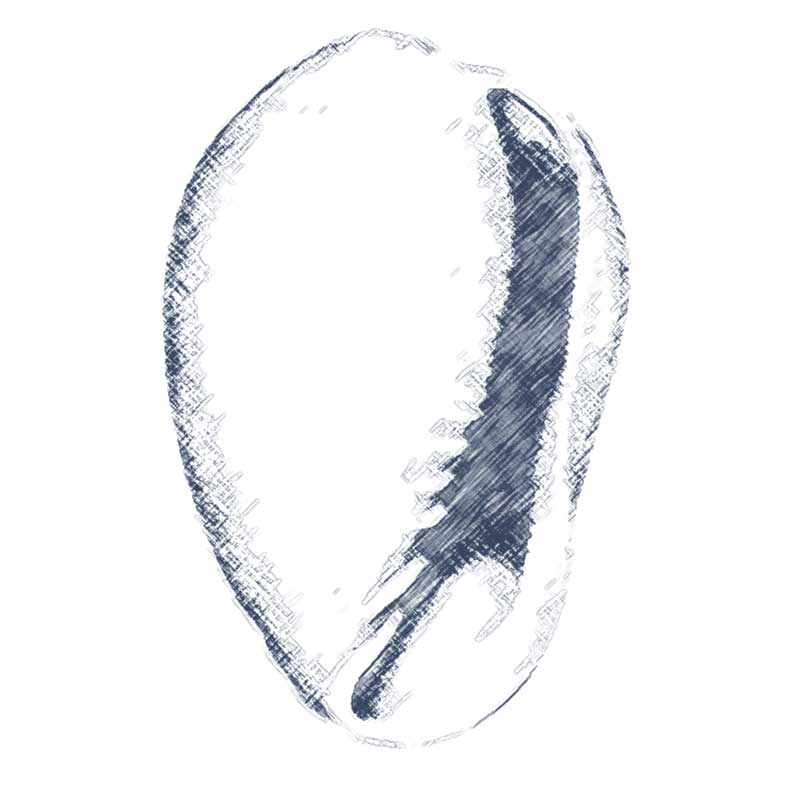
- A drawing of the shell of P. jewettii

Scientific classification
- Kingdom: Animalia
- Phylum: Mollusca
- Class: Gastropoda
- Subclass: Caenogastropoda
- Order: Neogastropoda
- Family: Cystiscidae
- Subfamily: Plesiocystiscinae
- Genus: Plesiocystiscus; Coovert & Coovert, 1995

Type species
- Marginella jewettii Carpenter, 1857

= Plesiocystiscus =

Genus of gastropods

Plesiocystiscus is a genus of minute predatory sea snails, marine gastropod molluscs or micromolluscs in the family Cystiscidae.

== Etymology ==
The genus name is derived from the Greek plesios, near, in the sense of plesiomorphic, of characters near the ancestor, combined with Cystiscus the name of another closely related genus. This indicates the relationship to the genus Cystiscus, type genus of the family. The gender of the name is masculine.

== Taxonomy ==
Sometimes this genus is simply left in the larger family Marginellidae. The type species is Marginella jewettii Carpenter, 1857.

(Note: Gastropod taxonomy has been in flux for more than half a century, and this is especially true currently, because of new research in molecular phylogeny. Because of all the ongoing changes, different reliable sources can yield very different classifications).

== Shell description ==
Shell minute to small (adult length 1,5 to 6.0 mm). Color white, hyaline; surface smooth, glossy. Shape cylindrical, elliptic, or obovate; weakly to distinctly shouldered. Suture rapidly descending on last half of last whorl, then abruptly sweeping upward just before lip, giving characteristic shape to adult shell. Spire nearly flat to low. Aperture moderately narrow, broader anteriorly. Lip thin anteriorly, gradually thickening tower shoulder, smooth, lacking denticulation or lirae, external varix absent. Siphonal notch and posterior notch absent. Shell often with a weak parietal callus wash or weak parietal callus deposits. Columella multiplicate, with combined total of 3-8 plications, usually occupying less than half to slightly more than half the aperture length. Shell with cystiscid internal whorls.

== Anatomy ==
The triserial radula, found in many other cystiscids, is the most primitive in this family. This is the only genus of marginelliform gastropods with a triserial radula. This group is considered to be the most primitive in the family based on the radula and type of animal. The radular and shell features, including the presence of odontophoral cartilage hoods, possession of cystiscid internal whorls, and lack of an external varix, place this group in the Cystiscidae.

== Ecology ==
=== Habitat ===
This genus lives from the intertidal zone to 80 m in depth.

== Fossil record ==
This genus is found in the Eocene of France, the Miocene and Pliocene of Florida, and the Pleistocene of California, to the Recent.

== Species ==
Species within the genus Plesiocystiscus include:

- Plesiocystiscus abbotti (de Jong & Coomans, 1988)
- Plesiocystiscus alfiopivai Espinosa & Ortea, 2002
- Plesiocystiscus alfredensis (Bartsch, 1915)
- Plesiocystiscus aphanospira (Tomlin, 1913)
- Plesiocystiscus atomus (E.A. Smith, 1890)
- Plesiocystiscus bavayi Boyer, 2003
- Plesiocystiscus bubistae (Fernandes, 1988)
- Plesiocystiscus buzio Ortea, Moro & Espinosa, 2020
- Plesiocystiscus cinereus (Jousseaume, 1875)
- Plesiocystiscus consanguineus (E.A. Smith, 1890)
- Plesiocystiscus elzae Bozzetti, Da Costa & T. Cossignani, 2010
- Plesiocystiscus fabioi T. Cossignani & Lorenz, 2020
- Plesiocystiscus franki Espinosa & Ortea, 2019
- Plesiocystiscus genecoani Espinosa & Ortea, 2000
- Plesiocystiscus gutta (Gofas & Fernandes, 1987)
- Plesiocystiscus irinae Bozzetti, Da Costa & T. Cossignani, 2010
- Plesiocystiscus jansseni (de Jong & Coomans, 1988)
- Plesiocystiscus janzeni Espinosa & Ortea, 2019
- Plesiocystiscus jardonae Ortea & Espinosa, 2016
- Plesiocystiscus jewettii (Carpenter, 1857)
- Plesiocystiscus josephinae (Fernandes & Rolan, 1991)
- Plesiocystiscus larva (Bavay, 1922)
- Plesiocystiscus leonorae Bozzetti, Da Costa & T. Cossignani, 2010
- Plesiocystiscus luiscarlosi Bozzetti, Da Costa & T. Cossignani, 2010
- Plesiocystiscus luteopunctatus Ortea, Moro & Espinosa, 2020
- Plesiocystiscus mariae (Espinosa & Ortea, 2014)
- Plesiocystiscus mongei Espinosa & Ortea, 2019
- Plesiocystiscus ovatus Lussi & Smith, 1998
- Plesiocystiscus palantirulus (Roth & Coan, 1968)
- Plesiocystiscus politulus (Dall, 1919)
- Plesiocystiscus pseudogranulina Lussi & Smith, 1998
- Plesiocystiscus thalia (Turton, 1932)
- Plesiocystiscus tomlini (Bavay, 1917)
- Plesiocystiscus valae Lussi & Smith, 1998
- Plesiocystiscus variegatus Lussi & Smith, 1998
- Plesiocystiscus violaceus Rolán E. & Gori S. 2014
- Plesiocystiscus watanuensis Cossignani, 2001

Synonyms

- Plesiocystiscus bocasensis (Olsson & McGinty, 1958): synonym of Plesiocystiscus larva (Bavay, 1922)

== Footnotes ==
- Espinosa & Ortea (2000). "Descripción de un género y once especies nuevas de Cystiscidae y Marginellidae (Mollusca: Neogastropoda) del Caribe de Costa Rica". Aviccenia 12/13: 95–114.
- Espinosa & Ortea (2002). "Nuevas especies de margineliformes de Cuba, Bahamas y el Mar Caribe de Costa Rica". Avicennia 15: 101–128.
- Bozzetti L., Da Costa D. & Cossignani, T. (2010) Quattro nuovi Plesiocystiscus dal Mozambico (Gastropoda: Prosobranchia, Cystiscidae). Malacologia Mostra Mondiale 69:16-18.
