= Canarium esculentum =

- Shell of Canarium esculentum (specimen at the Natural History Museum, Rotterdam)

Scientific classification
- Kingdom: Animalia
- Phylum: Mollusca
- Class: Gastropoda
- Subclass: Caenogastropoda
- Order: Littorinimorpha
- Family: Strombidae
- Genus: Canarium
- Species: C. esculentum

Binomial name
- Canarium esculentum S. J. Maxwell, Rymer, Congdon & Dekkers, 2020

Synonyms
- Canarium (Canarium) esculentum S. J. Maxwell, Rymer, Congdon & Dekkers, 2020 alternative representation; Strombus ustulatus f. laevis Dodge, 1946 (invalid: junior homonym of Strombus laevis Perry, 1811; Canarium esculentum is a replacement name)

Species of gastropod

Canarium esculentum is a species of sea snail, a marine gastropod mollusc in the family Strombidae, the true conchs.

== Description ==
The length of the shell attains 51 mm.

== Distribution ==
This marine species occurs off the Philippines.
