= Canarium incisum =

- Shell of Canarium incisum (specimen at the Natural History Museum, Rotterdam)

Scientific classification
- Kingdom: Animalia
- Phylum: Mollusca
- Class: Gastropoda
- Subclass: Caenogastropoda
- Order: Littorinimorpha
- Family: Strombidae
- Genus: Canarium
- Species: C. incisum

Binomial name
- Canarium incisum (W. Wood, 1828)

Synonyms
- Canarium (Canarium) incisum (W. Wood, 1828) · alternative representation; Canarium urceus incisum (W. Wood, 1828); Strombus incisus W. Wood, 1828 (original combination)

Species of gastropod

Canarium incisum is a species of sea snail, a marine gastropod mollusk in the family Strombidae, the true conchs.

== Description ==
The length of the shell varies between 40 mm and 45 mm.

== Distribution ==
This marine species occurs off Flores, Indonesia.
