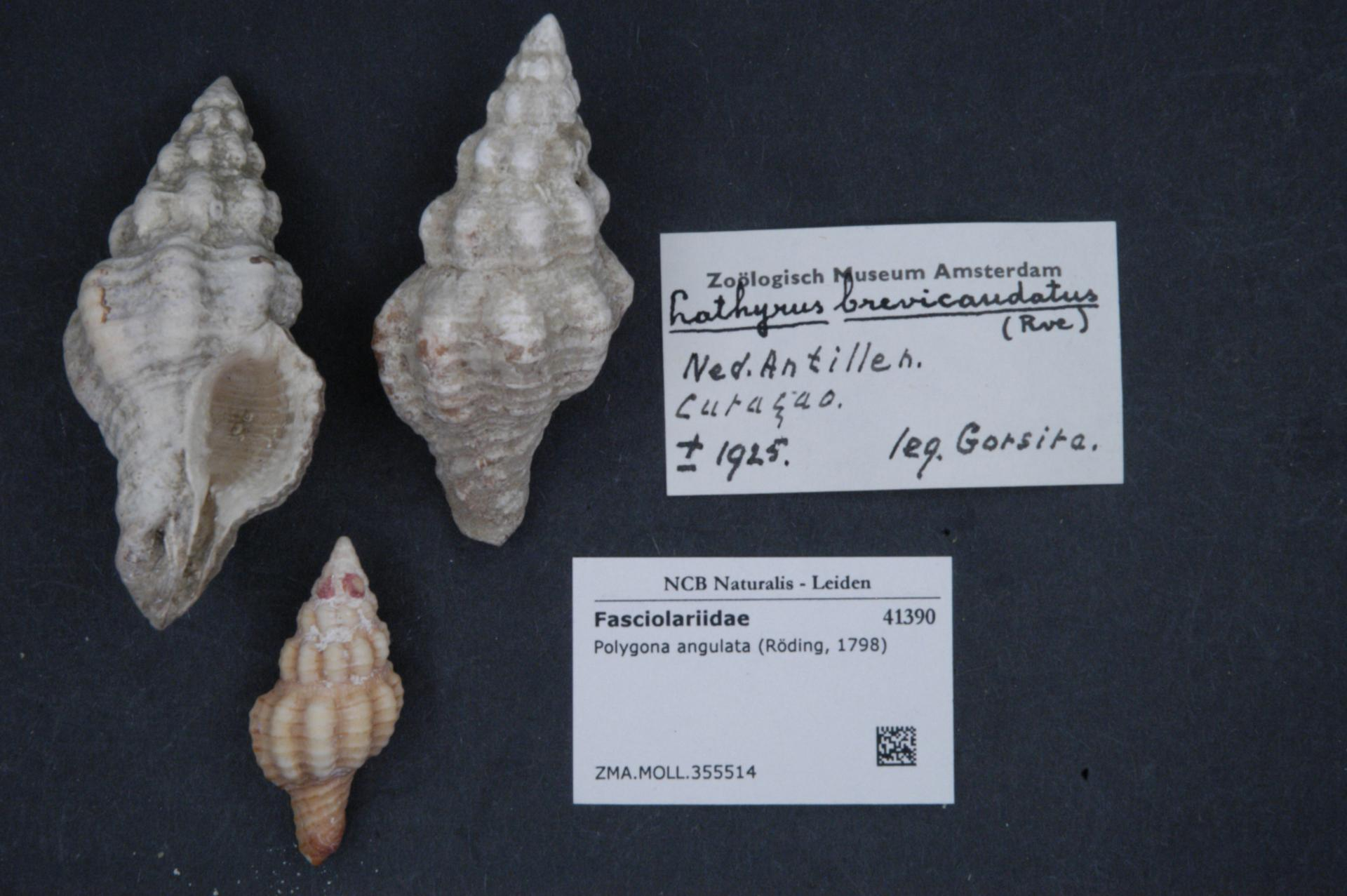

Scientific classification
- Kingdom: Animalia
- Phylum: Mollusca
- Class: Gastropoda
- Subclass: Caenogastropoda
- Order: Neogastropoda
- Family: Fasciolariidae
- Genus: Polygona
- Species: P. angulata

Binomial name
- Polygona angulata (Röding, 1798)

Synonyms
- Fusus angulatus Röding, 1798; Latirus angulatus (Röding, 1798)

= Polygona angulata =

Species of gastropod

Polygona angulata is a species of sea snail, a marine gastropod mollusk in the family Fasciolariidae, the spindle snails, the tulip snails and their allies.
