= Canarium nipponium =

Scientific classification
- Kingdom: Animalia
- Phylum: Mollusca
- Class: Gastropoda
- Subclass: Caenogastropoda
- Order: Littorinimorpha
- Family: Strombidae
- Genus: Canarium
- Species: C. nipponium

Binomial name
- Canarium nipponium S. J. Maxwell & Dekkers, 2021

Synonyms
- Canarium (Canarium) nipponium S. J. Maxwell & Dekkers, 2021 · alternative representation; Strombus ustulatum Linnéaeus, 1758; Strombus ustulatus Schumacher, 1936

Species of gastropod

Canarium nipponium is a species of sea snail, a marine gastropod mollusc in the family Strombidae, the true conchs.

== Description ==
The length of the shell attains 37 mm.

== Distribution ==
This marine species occurs off the Ryukyu Islands, Japan
