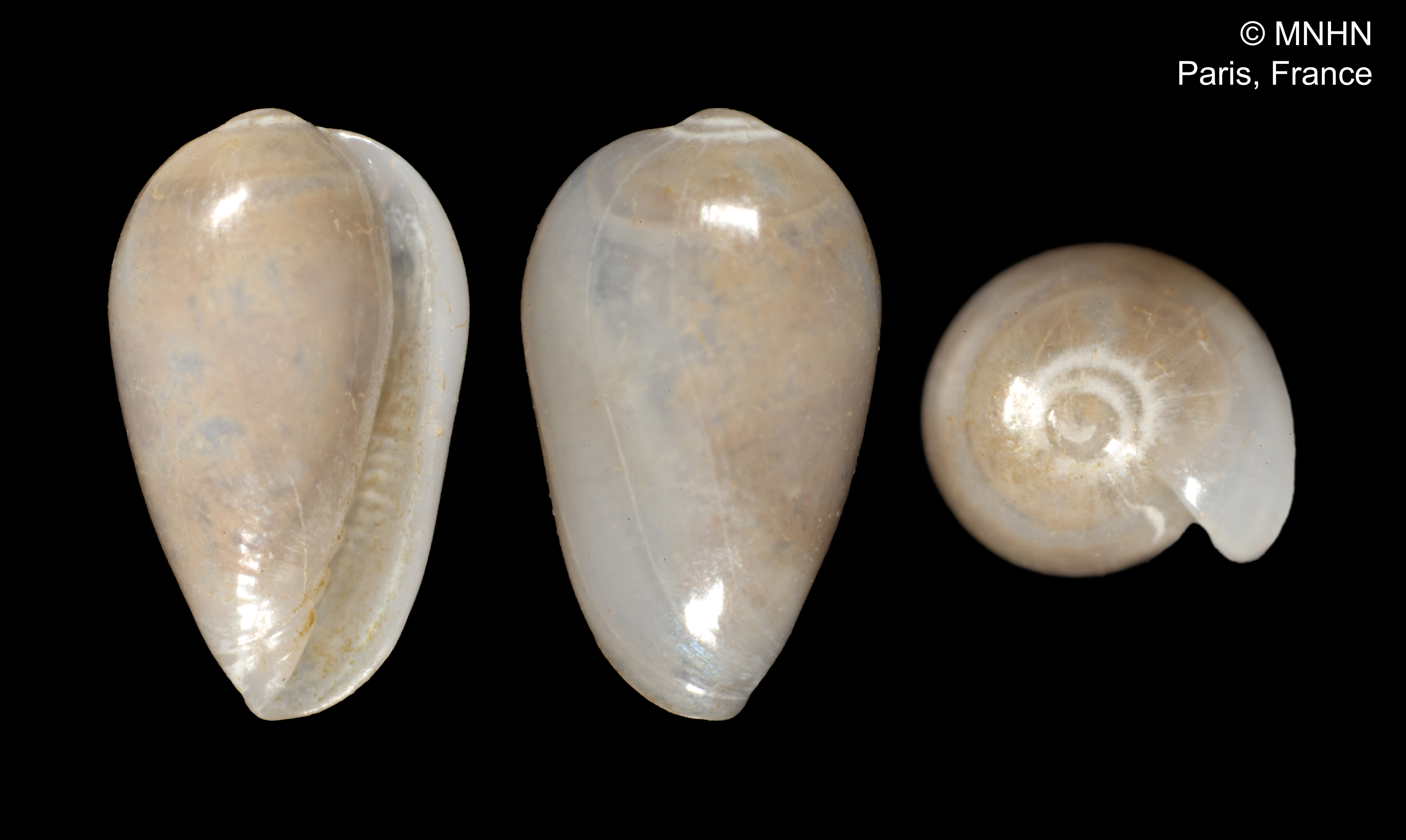
- Shell of Plesiocystiscus bavayi (holotype at MNHN, Paris)

Scientific classification
- Kingdom: Animalia
- Phylum: Mollusca
- Class: Gastropoda
- Subclass: Caenogastropoda
- Order: Neogastropoda
- Family: Cystiscidae
- Genus: Plesiocystiscus
- Species: P. bavayi

Binomial name
- Plesiocystiscus bavayi Boyer, 2003

= Plesiocystiscus bavayi =

Species of gastropod

Plesiocystiscus bavayi is a species of very small sea snail, a marine gastropod mollusc or micromollusc in the family Cystiscidae.

== Distribution ==
This marine species occurs off New Caledonia.
