= Polygona nemata =

Scientific classification
- Kingdom: Animalia
- Phylum: Mollusca
- Class: Gastropoda
- Subclass: Caenogastropoda
- Order: Neogastropoda
- Family: Fasciolariidae
- Genus: Polygona
- Species: P. nemata

Binomial name
- Polygona nemata (Woodring, 1928)

Synonyms
- Latirus nematus Woodring, 1928

Species of gastropod

Polygona nemata is a species of sea snail, a marine gastropod mollusk in the family Fasciolariidae, the spindle snails, the tulip snails and their allies.
