= Plesiocystiscus josephinae =

Conservation status
- Data Deficient (IUCN 2.3)

Scientific classification
- Kingdom: Animalia
- Phylum: Mollusca
- Class: Gastropoda
- Subclass: Caenogastropoda
- Order: Neogastropoda
- Family: Cystiscidae
- Genus: Plesiocystiscus
- Species: P. josephinae

Binomial name
- Plesiocystiscus josephinae (Fernandes & Rolán, 1992)

Synonyms
- Cystiscus josephinae Fernandes & Rolán, 1992

Species of gastropod

Plesiocystiscus josephinae is a species of small sea snail, a marine gastropod mollusk in the family Cystiscidae.

== Distribution ==
This species is endemic to São Tomé and Príncipe.
