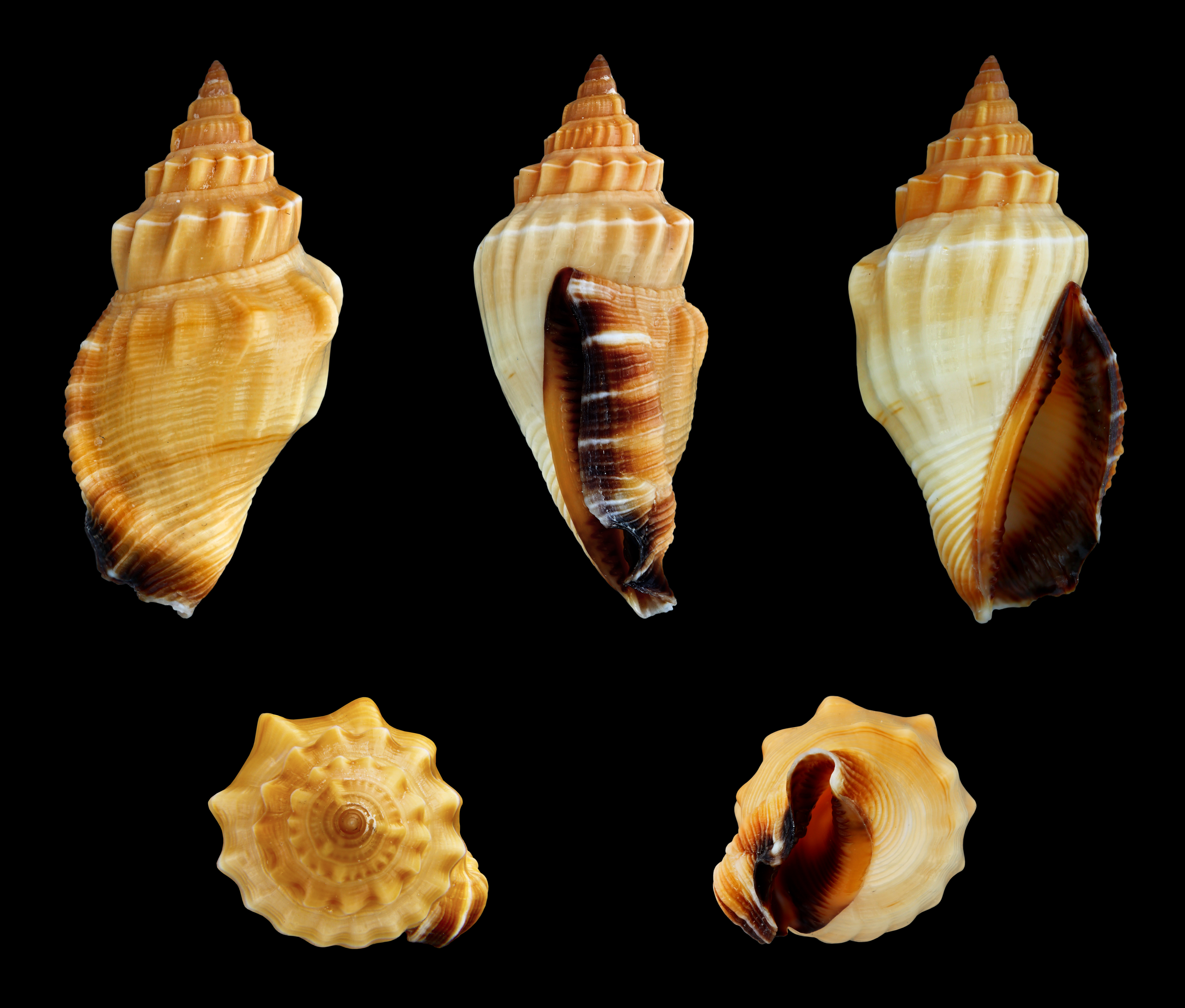
- Five views of a shell of Carnarium erythrinum

Scientific classification
- Kingdom: Animalia
- Phylum: Mollusca
- Class: Gastropoda
- Subclass: Caenogastropoda
- Order: Littorinimorpha
- Family: Strombidae
- Genus: Canarium
- Species: C. erythrinum

Binomial name
- Canarium erythrinum Dillwyn, 1817

Synonyms
- Canarium (Elegantum) erythrinum (Dillwyn, 1817) alternative representation; Strombus (Canarium) erythrinus (Dillwyn, 1817) superseded combination; Strombus erythrinus Dillwyn, 1817 (basionym); Strombus muricatus R. B. Watson, 1886 junior subjective synonym; Strombus ruppelli Reeve, 1850

= Canarium erythrinum =

Species of gastropod

Canarium erythrinum is a species of sea snail, a marine gastropod mollusk in the family Strombidae, the true conchs.

== Description ==
This sea shell has size going from 2 cm to 5 cm.

== Distribution ==
Canarium erythrinum is widespread throughout the tropical waters of the Indo/West Pacific area, including the Red Sea.
