= Canarium daveyi =

- Shell of Canarium daveyi (paratype at MNHN, Paris)

Scientific classification
- Kingdom: Animalia
- Phylum: Mollusca
- Class: Gastropoda
- Subclass: Caenogastropoda
- Order: Littorinimorpha
- Family: Strombidae
- Genus: Canarium
- Species: C. daveyi

Binomial name
- Canarium daveyi Dekkers & S. J. Maxwell, 2020

Synonyms
- Canarium (Canarium) daveyi Dekkers & S. J. Maxwell, 2020 alternative representation

Species of gastropod

Canarium daveyi is a species of sea snail, a marine gastropod mollusc in the family Strombidae, the true conchs.

== Description ==
The length of the shell attains 47.8 mm.

== Distribution ==
This marine species occurs off West Papua
