= Plesiocystiscus bubistae =

Scientific classification
- Kingdom: Animalia
- Phylum: Mollusca
- Class: Gastropoda
- Subclass: Caenogastropoda
- Order: Neogastropoda
- Family: Cystiscidae
- Genus: Plesiocystiscus
- Species: P. bubistae

Binomial name
- Plesiocystiscus bubistae (Fernandes, 1987)

Synonyms
- Cystiscus bubistae Fernandes, 1987 (basionym)

Species of gastropod

Plesiocystiscus bubistae is a species of very small sea snail, a marine gastropod mollusk or micromollusk in the family Cystiscidae.

== Description ==
The shell size varies between 1.5 mm and 2.3 mm.

== Distribution ==
This species occurs in the Atlantic Ocean along the Cape Verde Archipelago.
