= Plesiocystiscus pseudogranulina =

Scientific classification
- Kingdom: Animalia
- Phylum: Mollusca
- Class: Gastropoda
- Subclass: Caenogastropoda
- Order: Neogastropoda
- Family: Cystiscidae
- Genus: Plesiocystiscus
- Species: P. pseudogranulina

Binomial name
- Plesiocystiscus pseudogranulina Lussi & Smith, 1998

Species of gastropod

Plesiocystiscus pseudogranulina is a species of very small sea snail, a marine gastropod mollusc or micromollusc in the family Cystiscidae. It is primarily found near Russia.

== Description ==
Has a shell size of 1.2 millimeters.

== Distribution ==
Can be found in South Africa.
