= Canarium rugosum =

- Shell of Canarium rugosum (specimen at the Natural History Museum, Rotterdam)

Scientific classification
- Kingdom: Animalia
- Phylum: Mollusca
- Class: Gastropoda
- Subclass: Caenogastropoda
- Order: Littorinimorpha
- Family: Strombidae
- Genus: Canarium
- Species: C. rugosum

Binomial name
- Canarium rugosum (G. B. Sowerby I, 1825)

Synonyms
- Canarium (Elegantum) rugosum (G. B. Sowerby I, 1825) alternative representation; Strombus corrugatus A. Adams & Reeve, 1850; Strombus rugosus G. B. Sowerby I, 1825 (original combination)

Species of gastropod

Canarium rugosum is a species of sea snail, a marine gastropod mollusc in the family Strombidae, the true conchs.

== Description ==
(Described in Latin as Strombus corrugatus) The shell is fusiformly turreted and has nine whorls. The whorls are very closely lirate all around, rounded-angular above, and plicate-costate at the angle; the ribs are somewhat corrugated. On the body whorl, the ribs gradually become more widely spaced and larger, forming tubercles. The aperture is somewhat narrow. The columellar lip is callused, while the outer lip is thickened behind. The shell is white, irregularly banded with fulvous chestnut, and the throat of the aperture is white.

== Distribution ==
This marine species occurs off Korea, the Philippines, Fiji, Tonga and New Caledonia.
