= Canarium elegans (gastropod) =

- Shell of Canarium elegans (specimen at MNHN, Paris)

Scientific classification
- Kingdom: Animalia
- Phylum: Mollusca
- Class: Gastropoda
- Subclass: Caenogastropoda
- Order: Littorinimorpha
- Family: Strombidae
- Genus: Canarium
- Species: C. elegans

Binomial name
- Canarium elegans (G. B. Sowerby II, 1842)

Synonyms
- Canarium (Elegantum) elegans (G. B. Sowerby II, 1842) alternative representation; Strombus elegans G. B. Sowerby II, 1842 (original combination)

Species of gastropod

Canarium elegans is a species of sea snail, a marine gastropod mollusc in the family Strombidae, the true conchs.

== Description ==
(Original description in Latin) The shell is somewhat elongated and fusiform. The spire is somewhat elongated, with angular whorls that are plicated at the angles and minutely tuberculate in the middle; they are sulcate anteriorly. The margin of the body whorl is varicose. The aperture is oval and striated.

== Distribution ==
This marine species occurs off New Caledonia

Fossils have been found in Pleistocene strata in Djibouti.
