= Plesiocystiscus alfredensis =

Scientific classification
- Kingdom: Animalia
- Phylum: Mollusca
- Class: Gastropoda
- Subclass: Caenogastropoda
- Order: Neogastropoda
- Family: Cystiscidae
- Genus: Plesiocystiscus
- Species: P. alfredensis

Binomial name
- Plesiocystiscus alfredensis (Bartsch, 1915)

Species of gastropod

Plesiocystiscus alfredensis, common name the blue oval marginella, is a species of very small sea snail, a marine gastropod mollusc in the family Cystiscidae.

This species occurs throughout the Indo-Pacific Oceans. It prefer to live in sheltered areas.
