= Plesiocystiscus abbotti =

Scientific classification
- Kingdom: Animalia
- Phylum: Mollusca
- Class: Gastropoda
- Subclass: Caenogastropoda
- Order: Neogastropoda
- Family: Cystiscidae
- Subfamily: Plesiocystiscinae
- Genus: Plesiocystiscus
- Species: P. abbotti

Binomial name
- Plesiocystiscus abbotti (De Jong & Coomans, 1988)

Synonyms
- Volvarina abbotti De Jong & Coomans, 1988

Species of gastropod

Plesiocystiscus abbotti is a species of sea snail, a marine gastropod mollusk, in the family Cystiscidae.
