= Polygona tumens =

Krishna Reddy

Scientific classification
- Kingdom: Animalia
- Phylum: Mollusca
- Class: Gastropoda
- Subclass: Caenogastropoda
- Order: Neogastropoda
- Family: Fasciolariidae
- Genus: Polygona
- Species: P. tumens

Binomial name
- Polygona tumens (Carpenter, 1856)

Synonyms
- Latirus tumens Carpenter, 1856; Latyrus tumens (Carpenter, 1856)

Species of gastropod

Polygona tumens is a species of sea snail, a marine gastropod mollusk in the family Fasciolariidae, the spindle snails, the tulip snails and their allies.
