= Polygona anapetes =

Scientific classification
- Kingdom: Animalia
- Phylum: Mollusca
- Class: Gastropoda
- Subclass: Caenogastropoda
- Order: Neogastropoda
- Family: Fasciolariidae
- Genus: Polygona
- Species: P. anapetes

Binomial name
- Polygona anapetes (Woodring, 1964)

Synonyms
- Latirus anapetes Woodring, 1964

Species of gastropod

Polygona anapetes is a sea snail species, a marine gastropod mollusk in the Fasciolariidae family, the spindle snails, the tulip snails and their allies.
