= Canarium darwinense =

Scientific classification
- Kingdom: Animalia
- Phylum: Mollusca
- Class: Gastropoda
- Subclass: Caenogastropoda
- Order: Littorinimorpha
- Family: Strombidae
- Genus: Canarium
- Species: C. darwinense

Binomial name
- Canarium darwinense S. J. Maxwell & Dekkers, 2021

Synonyms
- Canarium (Canarium) darwinense S. J. Maxwell & Dekkers, 2021· alternative representation; Strombus (Canarium) urceus orrae Abbott, 1960; Strombus (Canarium) urceus incisus Wood – Walls, 1980; Strombus (Canarium) urceus Linnaeus, 1758

Species of gastropod

Canarium darwinense is a species of sea snail, a marine gastropod mollusc in the family Strombidae, the true conchs.

== Description ==
The length of the shell attains 42 mm.

== Distribution ==
This marine species occurs off the Northern Territory, Australia.
