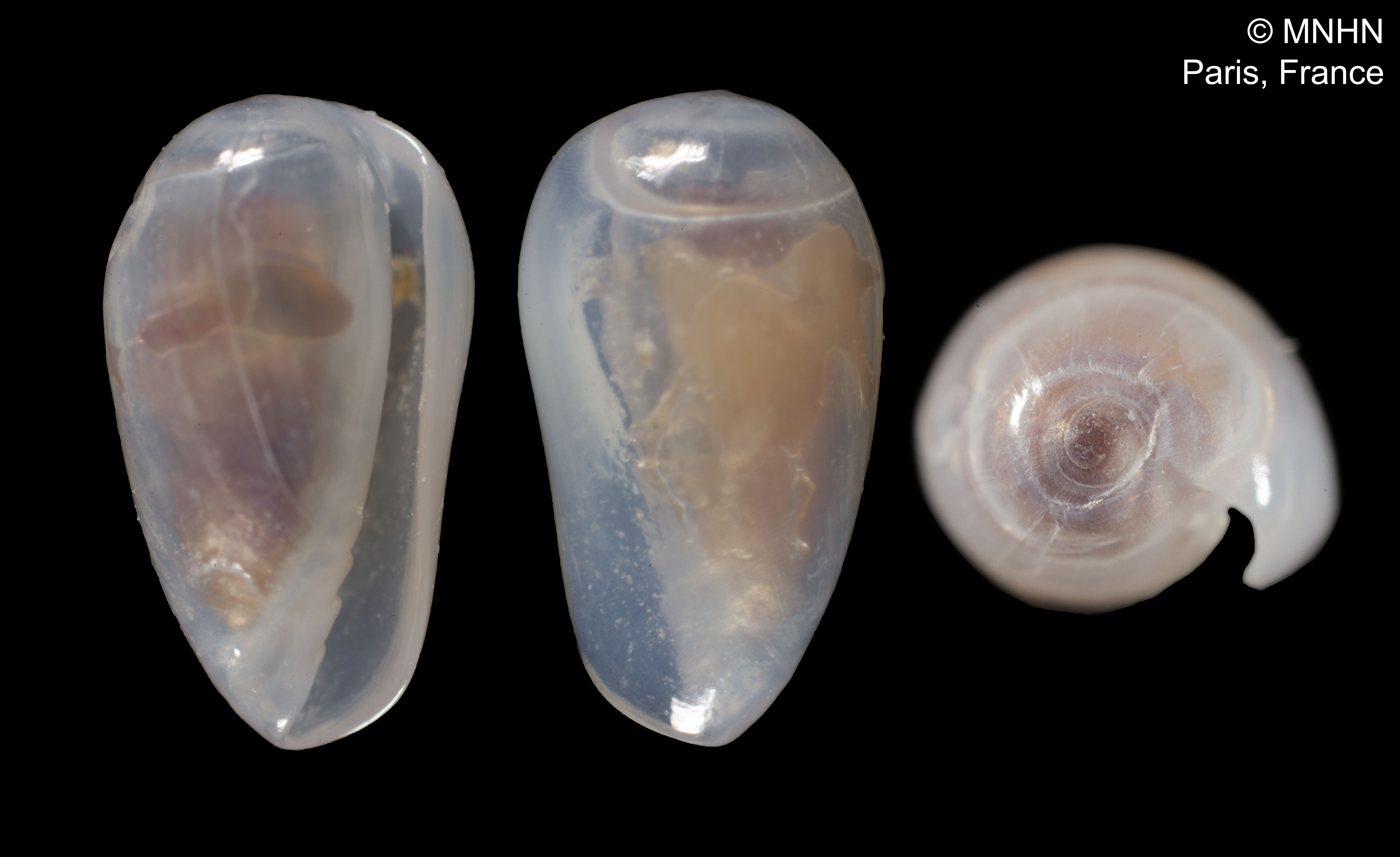
- Shell of Plesiocystiscus gutta (holotype at MNHN, Paris)

Conservation status
- Data Deficient (IUCN 2.3)

Scientific classification
- Kingdom: Animalia
- Phylum: Mollusca
- Class: Gastropoda
- Subclass: Caenogastropoda
- Order: Neogastropoda
- Family: Cystiscidae
- Genus: Plesiocystiscus
- Species: P. gutta

Binomial name
- Plesiocystiscus gutta (Gofás & Fernandes, 1988)

Synonyms
- Cystiscus gutta Gofás & Fernandes, 1988

= Plesiocystiscus gutta =

Species of gastropod

Plesiocystiscus gutta is a species of small sea snail, a marine gastropod in the family Cystiscidae.

== Distribution ==
This species is endemic to São Tomé and Príncipe.
