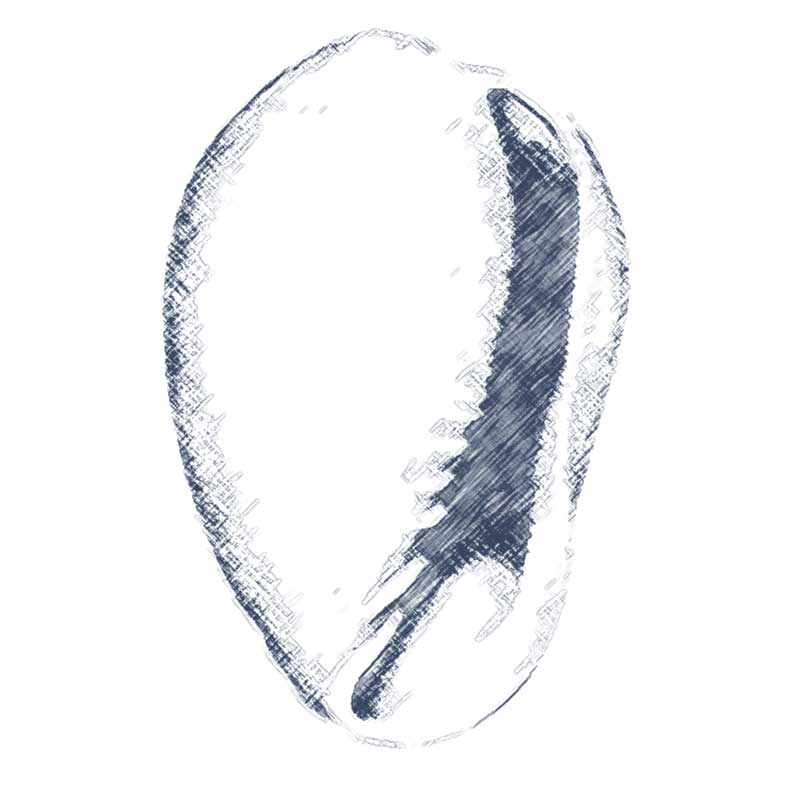
- A drawing of the shell of P. jewettii

Scientific classification
- Domain: Eukaryota
- Kingdom: Animalia
- Phylum: Mollusca
- Class: Gastropoda
- Subclass: Caenogastropoda
- Order: Neogastropoda
- Family: Cystiscidae
- Genus: Plesiocystiscus
- Species: P. jewettii

Binomial name
- Plesiocystiscus jewettii Carpenter, 1856

= Plesiocystiscus jewettii =

Species of gastropod

Plesiocystiscus jewettii is a species of small predatory sea snail, a marine gastropod mollusc in the family Cystiscidae.
