= Plesiocystiscus genecoani =

Scientific classification
- Kingdom: Animalia
- Phylum: Mollusca
- Class: Gastropoda
- Subclass: Caenogastropoda
- Order: Neogastropoda
- Family: Cystiscidae
- Genus: Plesiocystiscus
- Species: P. genecoani

Binomial name
- Plesiocystiscus genecoani Espinosa & Ortea, 2000

Species of gastropod

Plesiocystiscus genecoani is a species of very small sea snail, a marine gastropod mollusc or micromollusc in the family Cystiscidae.
