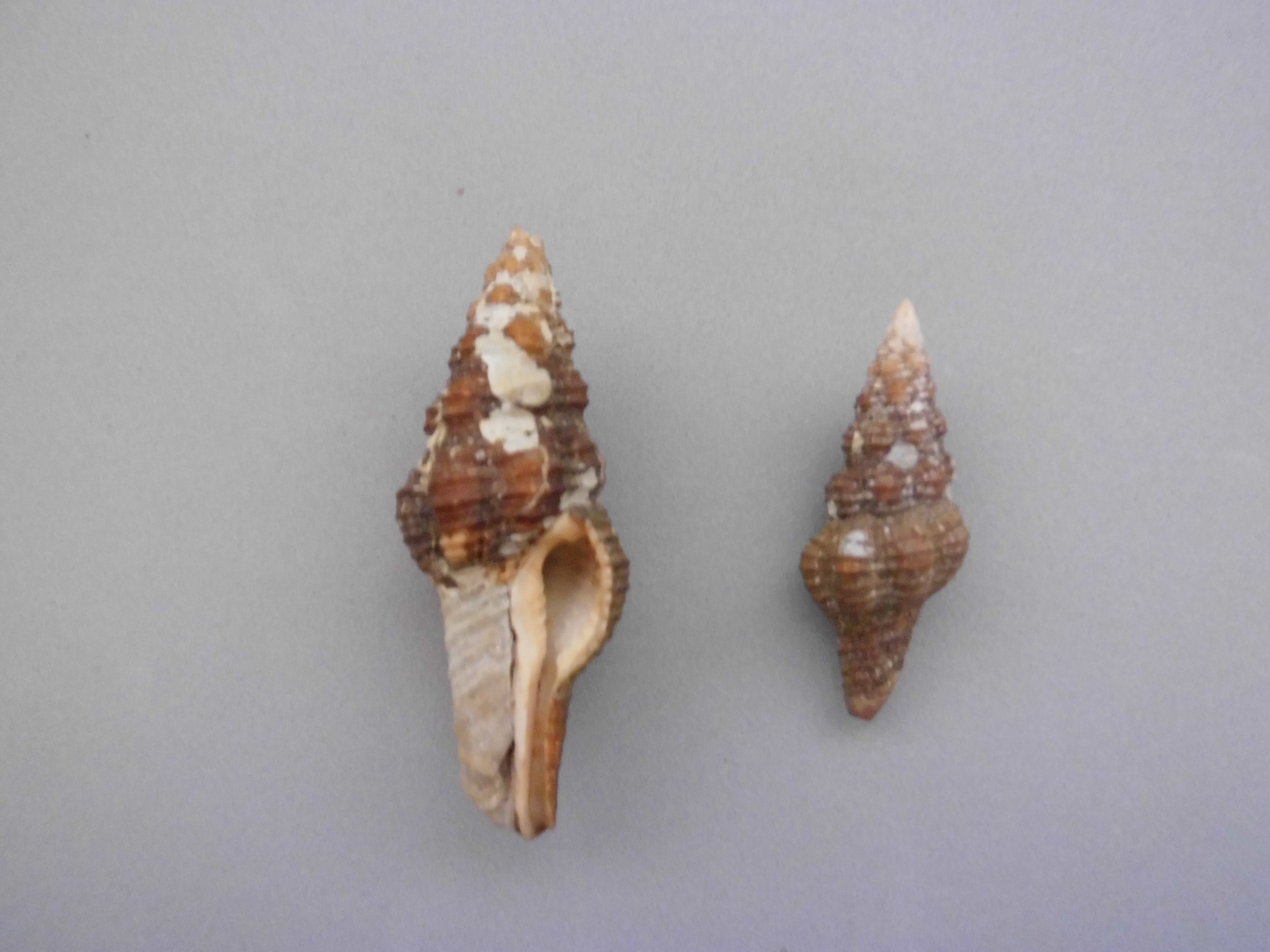

Scientific classification
- Kingdom: Animalia
- Phylum: Mollusca
- Class: Gastropoda
- Subclass: Caenogastropoda
- Order: Neogastropoda
- Family: Fasciolariidae
- Genus: Polygona
- Species: P. infundibulum

Binomial name
- Polygona infundibulum (Gmelin, 1791)

Synonyms
- Murex infundibulum Gmelin, 1791; Latirus infundibulum (Gmelin, 1791)

= Polygona infundibulum =

Species of gastropod

Polygona infundibulum is a species of sea snail, a marine gastropod mollusk in the family Fasciolariidae, the spindle snails, the tulip snails and their allies.

== Description ==
Shell size 45-50 mm.

== Distribution ==
East coast of Florida.
