= Polygona bayeri =

Scientific classification
- Kingdom: Animalia
- Phylum: Mollusca
- Class: Gastropoda
- Subclass: Caenogastropoda
- Order: Neogastropoda
- Family: Fasciolariidae
- Genus: Polygona
- Species: P. bayeri

Binomial name
- Polygona bayeri (Petuch, 2001)

Synonyms
- Latirus bayeri Petuch, 2001

Species of gastropod

Polygona bayeri is a species of sea snail, a marine gastropod mollusk in the family Fasciolariidae, the spindle snails, the tulip snails and their allies.
