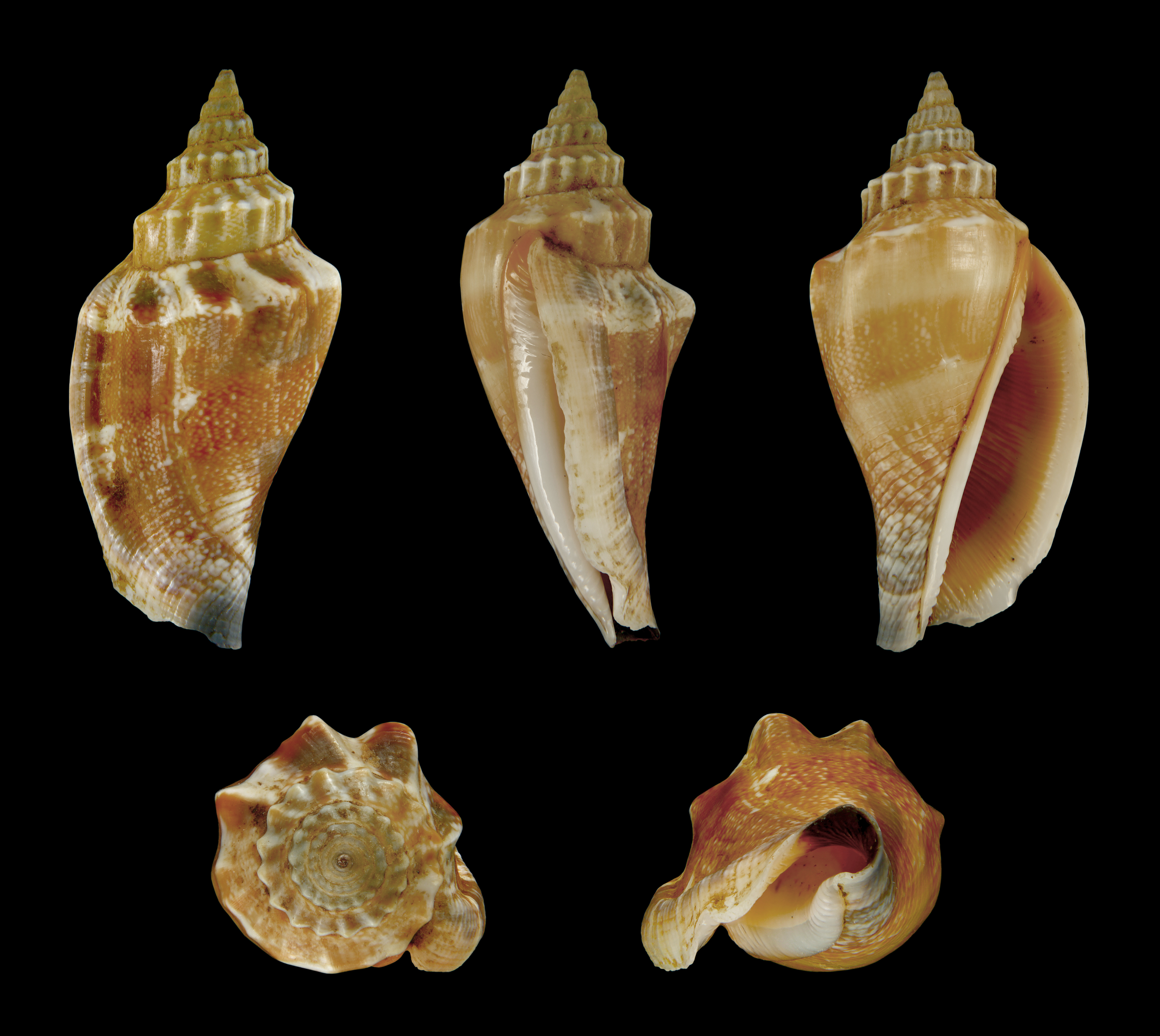
- Five views of a shell of Canarium olydium

Scientific classification
- Kingdom: Animalia
- Phylum: Mollusca
- Class: Gastropoda
- Subclass: Caenogastropoda
- Order: Littorinimorpha
- Family: Strombidae
- Genus: Canarium
- Species: C. olydium

Binomial name
- Canarium olydium (Duclos, 1844)

Synonyms
- Strombus labiatus olydius (Duclos, 1844); Strombus olydius Duclos, 1844 (original combination)

= Canarium olydium =

Species of gastropod

Canarium olydium is a species of sea snail, a marine gastropod mollusc in the family Strombidae, the true conchs.

== Description ==
Canarium olydium has a size of 20 – 48 mm.

== Distribution ==
Records of Canarium olydium can be found throughout the Indian Ocean region.
