= Canarium orrae =

Scientific classification
- Kingdom: Animalia
- Phylum: Mollusca
- Class: Gastropoda
- Subclass: Caenogastropoda
- Order: Littorinimorpha
- Family: Strombidae
- Genus: Canarium
- Species: C. orrae

Binomial name
- Canarium orrae (Abbott, 1960)

Synonyms
- Canarium (Canarium) orrae (Abbott, 1960) alternative representation; Canarium urceus orrae (Abbott, 1960); Strombus (Canarium) urceus orrae Abbott, 1960 (basionym); Strombus urceus orrae Abbott, 1960

Species of gastropod

Canarium orrae is a species of sea snail, a marine gastropod mollusc in the family Strombidae, the true conchs.

== Description ==
The length of the shell attains 47.8 mm, its diameter 21.1 mm.

== Distribution ==
This marine species occurs off Western Australia to the Gulf of Carpentaria, Australia
