= Chicoreus cosmani =

Scientific classification
- Kingdom: Animalia
- Phylum: Mollusca
- Class: Gastropoda
- Subclass: Caenogastropoda
- Order: Neogastropoda
- Family: Muricidae
- Genus: Chicoreus
- Species: C. cosmani

Binomial name
- Chicoreus cosmani Abbott & Finlay, 1979

Synonyms
- Chicoreus cosmani Abbott & Finlay, 1979

Species of gastropod

The cosman's Murex (Chicoreus cosmani) is a species of sea snail, a marine gastropod mollusk in the family Muricidae, the murex snails or rock snails.
