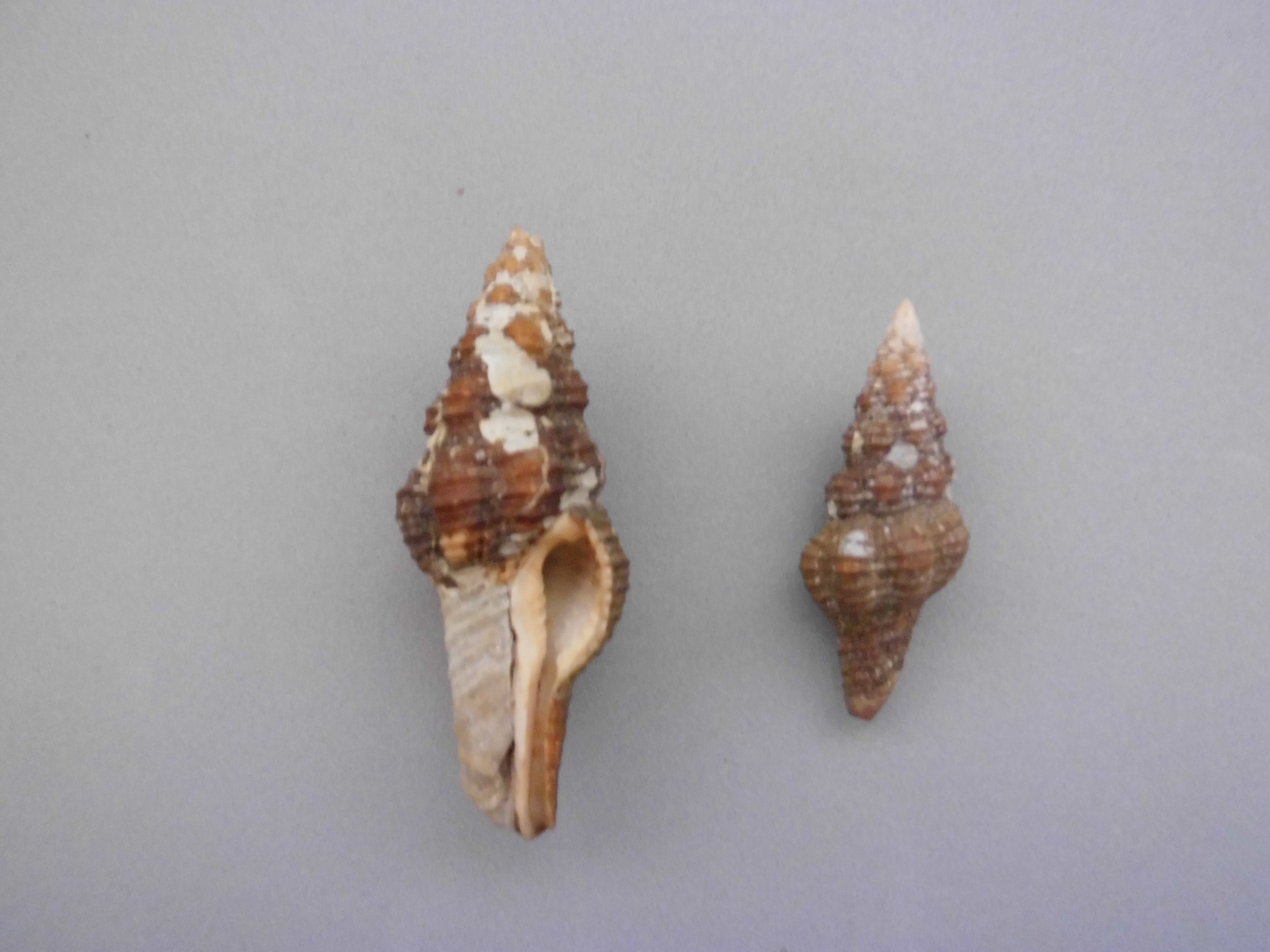
- Polygona infundibula

Scientific classification
- Kingdom: Animalia
- Phylum: Mollusca
- Class: Gastropoda
- Subclass: Caenogastropoda
- Order: Neogastropoda
- Family: Fasciolariidae
- Subfamily: Fusininae
- Genus: Polygona; Schumacher, 1817

Type species
- Polygona infundibulum Schumacher, 1817

= Polygona =

Genus of gastropods

Polygona is a genus of sea snails, marine gastropod mollusks in the family Fasciolariidae, the spindle snails, the tulip snails and their allies.

== Species ==
Species within the genus Polygona include:

- Polygona abbotti (Snyder, 2003)
- Polygona anapetes (Woodring, 1964)
- Polygona angulata (Röding, 1798)
- Polygona bayeri (Petuch, 2001)
- Polygona bernandensis (Bullock, 1974)
- Polygona brevicaudata (Reeve, 1847)
- Polygona concentrica (Reeve, 1847)
- † Polygona crassa (Michelotti, 1847)
- Polygona devyanae (Rios, Costa & Calvo, 1994)
- Polygona filosa (Schubert & Wagner, 1829)
- Polygona infundibulum (Gmelin, 1791)
- Polygona jucunda (McGinty, 1940)
- Polygona lactea (Matthews-Cascon, Matthews & Rocha, 1991)
- † Polygona lynchii (Basterot, 1825)
- Polygona martini (Snyder, 1988)
- Polygona nemata (Woodring, 1928)
- Polygona paulae Petuch, 2013
- Polygona socorroensis (Hertlein & Strong, 1951)
- Polygona tumens (Carpenter, 1856)
- Polygona vermeiji (Petuch, 1986)
- † Polygona zahlbruckneri (Glibert, 1963)

Species brought into synonymy

- Polygona bessei Petuch, 2013: synonym of Lamellilatirus sunderlandorum Lyons & Snyder, 2013
- Polygona fusiformis Schumacher, 1817: synonym of Polygona infundibulum (Gmelin, 1791)
