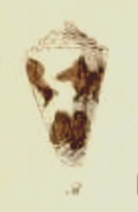
- Original drawing of a shell of Conus sphacelatus

Scientific classification
- Kingdom: Animalia
- Phylum: Mollusca
- Class: Gastropoda
- Subclass: Caenogastropoda
- Order: Neogastropoda
- Superfamily: Conoidea
- Family: Conidae
- Genus: Conus
- Species: C. sphacelatus

Binomial name
- Conus sphacelatus G. B. Sowerby I, 1833

Synonyms
- Conus (Dauciconus) sphacelatus G. B. Sowerby I, 1833 · accepted, alternate representation; Conus liratus Reeve, 1844; Purpuriconus sphacelatus (G. B. Sowerby I, 1833)

= Conus sphacelatus =

Species of sea snail

Conus sphacelatus is a species of sea snail, a marine gastropod mollusk in the family Conidae, the cone snails and their allies.

Like all species within the genus Conus, these snails are predatory and venomous. They are capable of stinging humans, therefore live ones should be handled carefully or not at all.

== Description ==
The size of the shell varies between 17 mm and 20 mm.

== Distribution ==
This species occurs in the Caribbean Sea.
