= Emanuel Mendes da Costa =

English botanist, naturalist, philosopher and collector

Emanuel Mendes da Costa FRS
- Born: 5 June 1717
- Died: 31 May 1791 (aged 73); London, England
- Known for: British Conchology, embezzlement of Royal Society funds
- Spouses: Leah del Prado, Elizabeth Skillman
- Children: One daughter by second wife
- Parents: Abraham da Costa (Christian name John) (father); Esther da Costa (Christian name Joanna) (mother)
- Scientific career
- Fields: Botanist, naturalist, philosopher
- Institutions: Clerk to the Royal Society

Emanuel Mendes da Costa (5 June 1717 – 31 May 1791) (Note: Also spelt Mendez da Costa) was an English botanist, naturalist, philosopher, and collector of valuable notes and of manuscripts. He also collected anecdotes on the contemporary literati. Da Costa became infamous for embezzling funds while working at the Royal Society in London and was imprisoned.

== Career ==
Da Costa came from a Sephardi family that had moved to England in the 1600s from Portugal. His parents were Abraham and Esther. Abraham is thought to have been in the diamond trade business. One of his brothers became a wealthy businessman. Emanuel worked in the office of a notary and qualified while working for the Scriveners' Company in 1762.

Da Costa pursued his interest in natural history from around 1736 onward. He began to trade in seashells, corals and fossils. He corresponded with Carl Linnaeus, Hans Sloane, and other naturalists of the period. Da Costa was elected one of the first Jewish Fellows of the Royal Society in 1747, sponsored among others by Martin Folkes. In 1750, da Costa married Leah, whose brother Abraham del Prado was a wealthy contractor for the English army, supplying food. Around 1740, Abraham had employed da Costa in the Netherlands but this led to unpaid debts and resulted in da Costa's imprisonment for two years.

In 1763, the death of Francis Hauksbee, who had served for forty years as clerk to the Royal Society, led to an opening that he bid for by enlisting the votes and endorsements from his friends and correspondents. He was appointed simultaneously as clerk, librarian, keeper of the repository and housekeeper for the Royal Society. But in 1767 he was discovered to be withholding members' subscription fees, was convicted of fraud, and sentenced to five years in debtors' prison. The evidence was detected when John Hope was listed as an annual instead of a perpetual member and sought an investigation of the matter. Da Costa released the annual membership fees to the Royal Society while profiting personally from interest incurred on the remainder of the life membership subscriptions.

After his release from prison, he struggled to make a living lecturing about fossils and dealing in shells and minerals. His last scientific publication was British Conchology (1778), which included an autobiographical preface. Some friends remained loyal even after his imprisonment. These included Ingham Forster (1725-1782), brother of Jacob Forster (1739-1806). Da Costa died in his home in the Strand and was buried in the Bethahaim Velho, 243 Mile End Road, London.

Da Costa was also a fellow of the Antiquarian Society of London from 1752; a member of the Botanic Society in Florence (Società botanica fiorentina), the Aurelian Society, and the Gentleman's Society at Spalding. He was married twice, first to Leah, who died in 1763 without issue. His second wife, Elizabeth Skillman, outlived him and they had a daughter.

== Works ==
His publications included:

- A Natural History of Fossils, 1757
- Elements of Conchology, or An Introduction to the Knowledge of Shells, 1776 (illustrated by Peter Brown);
- British Conchology, 1778
- several papers in the Philosophical Transactions of the Royal Society

== Bibliography ==
- Jewish Encyclopedia
- Rousseau, G. S.; Haycock, David (2000). "The Jew of Crane Court: Emanuel Mendes Da Costa (1717–91), Natural History and Natural Excess". History of Science. 38 (2): 127–170. Bibcode:2000HisSc..38..127R. doi:10.1177/007327530003800201. S2CID 161134195.
- James Grout: Da Costa and the Venus dione: The Obscenity of Shell Description, part of the Encyclopædia Romana
- Wikisource DNB entry
