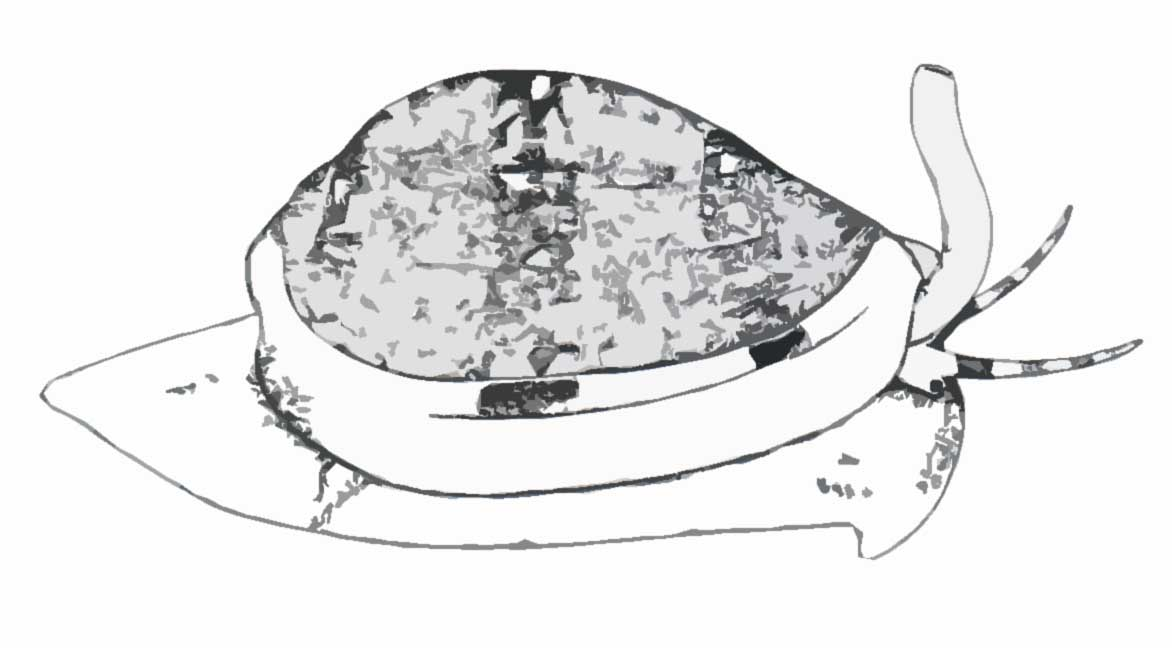
- Drawing of a live animal of this subfamily

Scientific classification
- Domain: Eukaryota
- Kingdom: Animalia
- Phylum: Mollusca
- Class: Gastropoda
- Subclass: Caenogastropoda
- Order: Neogastropoda
- Family: Cystiscidae
- Subfamily: Plesiocystiscinae; Coovert & Coovert, 1995

= Plesiocystiscinae =

Subfamily of gastropods

Plesiocystiscinae is a subfamily of minute sea predatory sea snails, marine gastropod mollusks or micromollusks in the infraorder Neogastropoda.

The genus name on which this subfamily name is based is derived from the Greekword plesios, near, in the sense of plesiomorphic, in other words having characters close to those of the ancestor, combined with Cystiscus the name of a closely related genus.

Sometimes the single genus in this subfamily is simply left in the larger family Marginellidae.

(Note: Gastropod taxonomy has been in flux for more than half a century, and this is especially true currently, because of new research in molecular phylogeny. Because of all the ongoing changes, different reliable sources can yield very different classifications.)

== Shell description ==
Shell minute to small, white, hyaline; last whorl rapidly expanded then lip abruptly swept posteriorly giving characteristic shape; spire flat to low; lip thickened posteriorly, smooth, lacking lirae or denticulation, external varix absent; siphonal notch absent; posterior notch absent; columella multiplicate with combined total of 3-8 plications plus parietal lirae; internal whorls cystiscid type.

== Description of soft parts ==
Animal tentacles and siphon are moderately long. The mantle is translucent, and in some species it is not readily extended over the external shell surface. The foot is relatively narrow. The internal anatomy is unknown.

== Genus ==
Genus in this subfamily:

- Plesiocystiscus Coovert and Coovert, 1994
