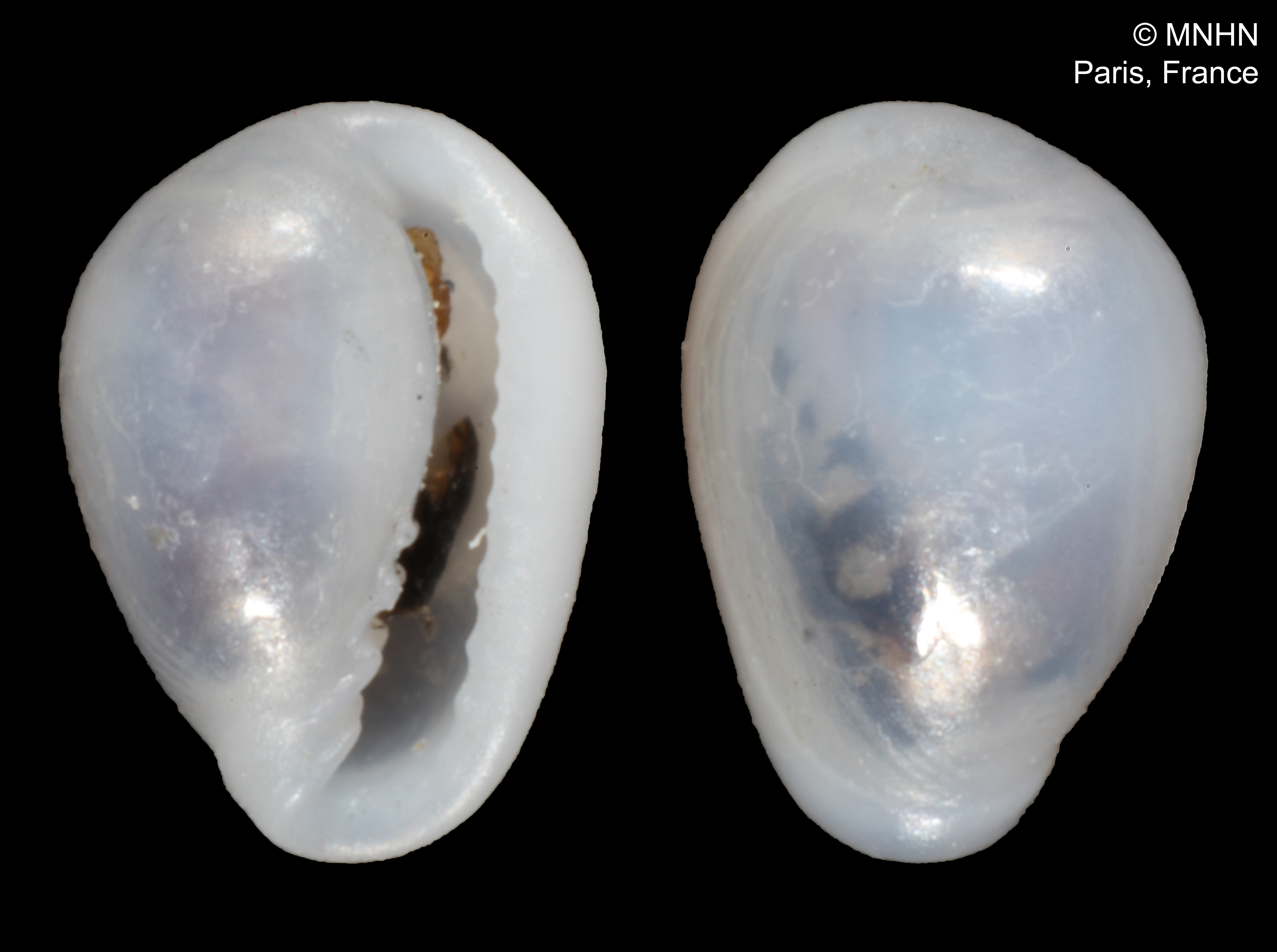
- Shell of Granulina boucheti (holotype at MNHN, Paris)

Scientific classification
- Kingdom: Animalia
- Phylum: Mollusca
- Class: Gastropoda
- Subclass: Caenogastropoda
- Order: Neogastropoda
- Family: Granulinidae
- Genus: Granulina
- Species: G. boucheti

Binomial name
- Granulina boucheti Gofas, 1992

= Granulina boucheti =

Species of gastropod

Granulina boucheti is a species of small sea snail, a marine gastropod mollusc in the family Granulinidae.

== Description ==
The length of the shell attains 2.1 mm.

== Distribution ==
This marine species is endemic to Sicily. The type locality is Aci Trezza.
