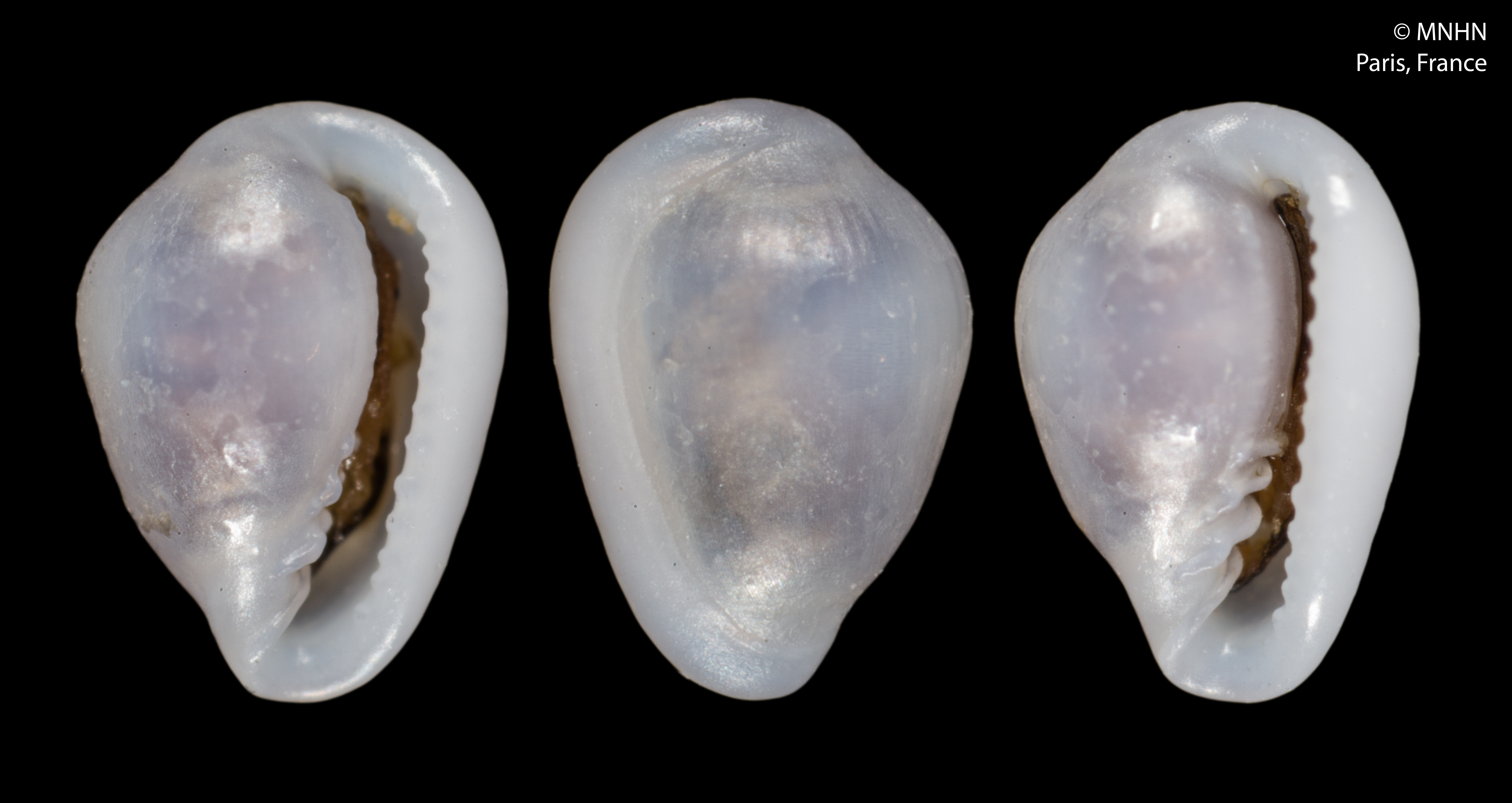
- Shell of Granulina torosa (holotype at MNHN, Paris)

Scientific classification
- Kingdom: Animalia
- Phylum: Mollusca
- Class: Gastropoda
- Subclass: Caenogastropoda
- Order: Neogastropoda
- Family: Granulinidae
- Genus: Granulina
- Species: G. torosa

Binomial name
- Granulina torosa Gofas, 1992

= Granulina torosa =

Species of gastropod

Granulina torosa is a species of very small sea snail, a marine gastropod mollusk or micromollusk in the family Marginellidae.

== Description ==
The length of the shell is approximately 2.2 mm. These small sea snails are white and have a small spire, the exterior of the shell is smooth and flat and its lip is thickened and denticulate.

== Distribution ==
This marine species was found in the Strait of Gibraltar.
