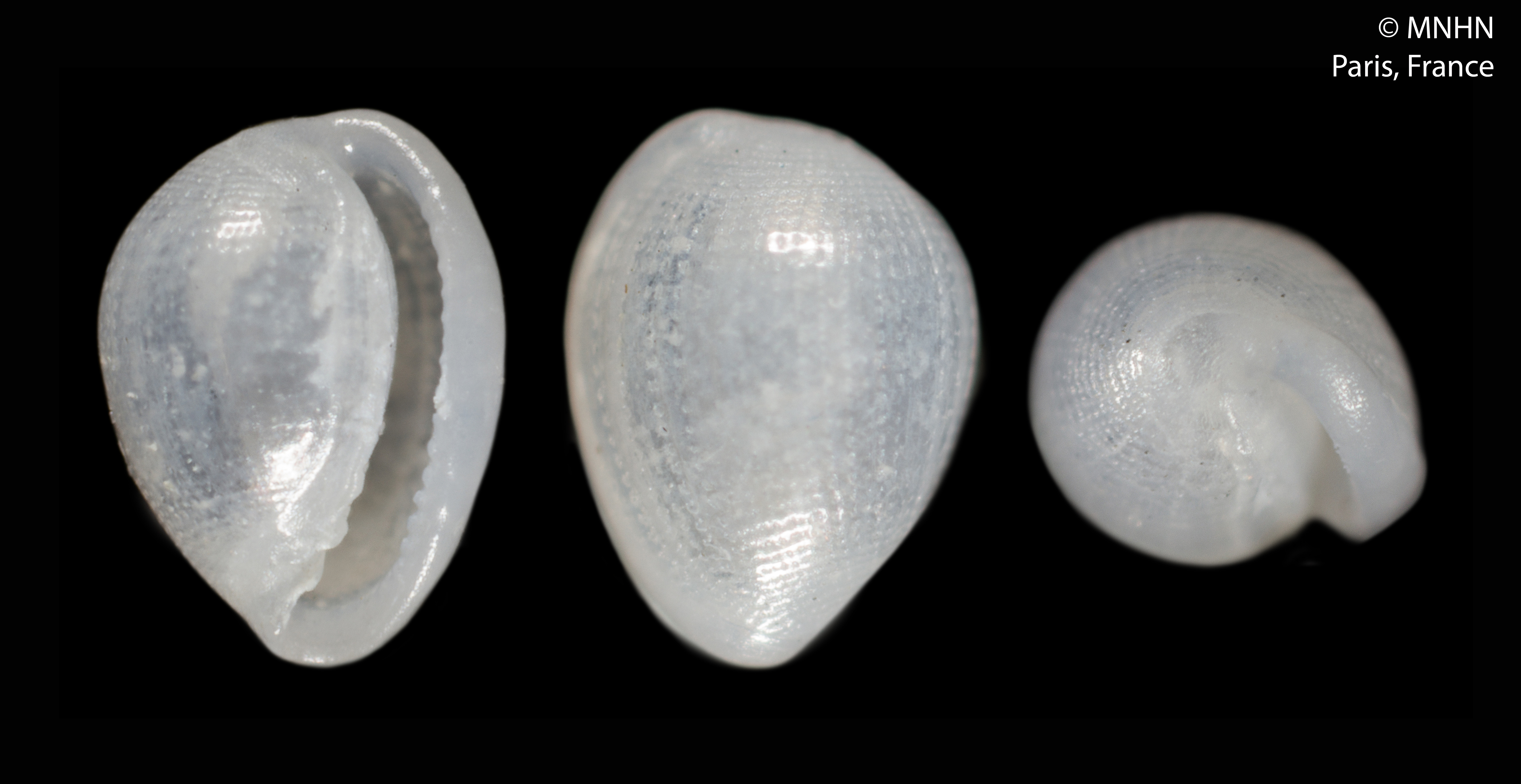
- Shell of Paolaura kloosi (holotype at MNHN, Paris)

Scientific classification
- Kingdom: Animalia
- Phylum: Mollusca
- Class: Gastropoda
- Subclass: Caenogastropoda
- Order: Neogastropoda
- Family: Granulinidae
- Genus: Paolaura
- Species: P. kloosi

Binomial name
- Paolaura kloosi Bozzetti, 2009

= Paolaura kloosi =

Species of gastropod

Paolaura kloosi is a species of very small sea snail, a marine gastropod mollusk or micromollusk in the family Granulinidae. The species was first described by Bozzetti in 2009.

== Description ==
The length of the shell attains 1.1 mm.

== Distribution ==
This marine species occurs off Flores, Indonesia.
