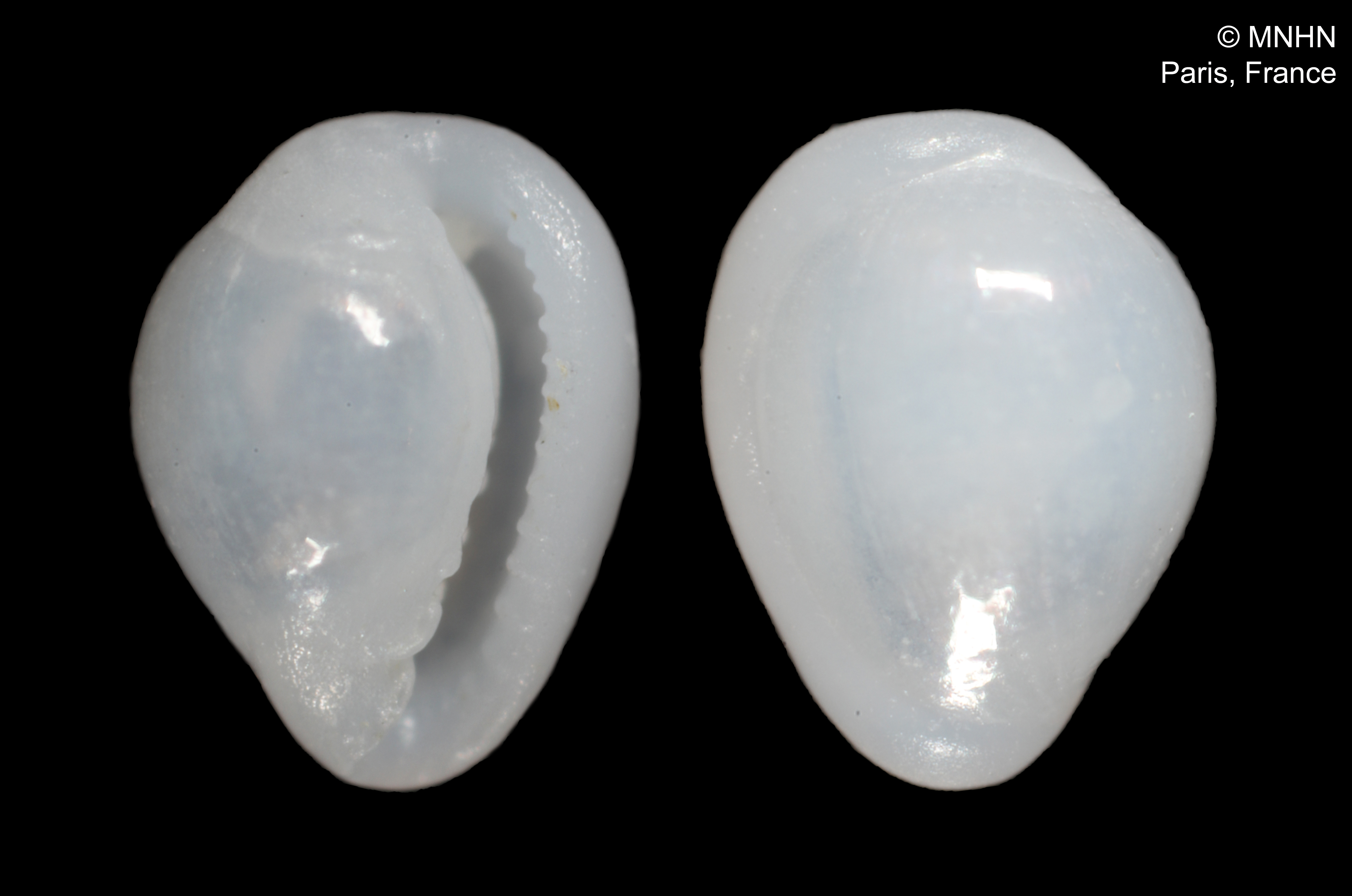
- Shell of Granulina globosa (holotype at MNHN, Paris)

Scientific classification
- Kingdom: Animalia
- Phylum: Mollusca
- Class: Gastropoda
- Subclass: Caenogastropoda
- Order: Neogastropoda
- Family: Granulinidae
- Genus: Granulina
- Species: G. globosa

Binomial name
- Granulina globosa Wakefield & McCleery, 2004

= Granulina globosa =

Species of gastropod

Granulina globosa is a species of very small sea snail, a marine gastropod mollusk or micromollusk in the family Granulinidae.

== Distribution ==
This marine species occurs off the Fiji Islands.
