= Granulina hadria =

Scientific classification
- Kingdom: Animalia
- Phylum: Mollusca
- Class: Gastropoda
- Subclass: Caenogastropoda
- Order: Neogastropoda
- Family: Granulinidae
- Genus: Granulina
- Species: G. hadria

Binomial name
- Granulina hadria (Dall, 1889)

Species of gastropod

Granulina hadria is a species of very small sea snail, a marine gastropod mollusk or micromollusk in the family Granulinidae. Granulina hadria is a species of fish in the family Cystiscidae. No subspecies are listed.
