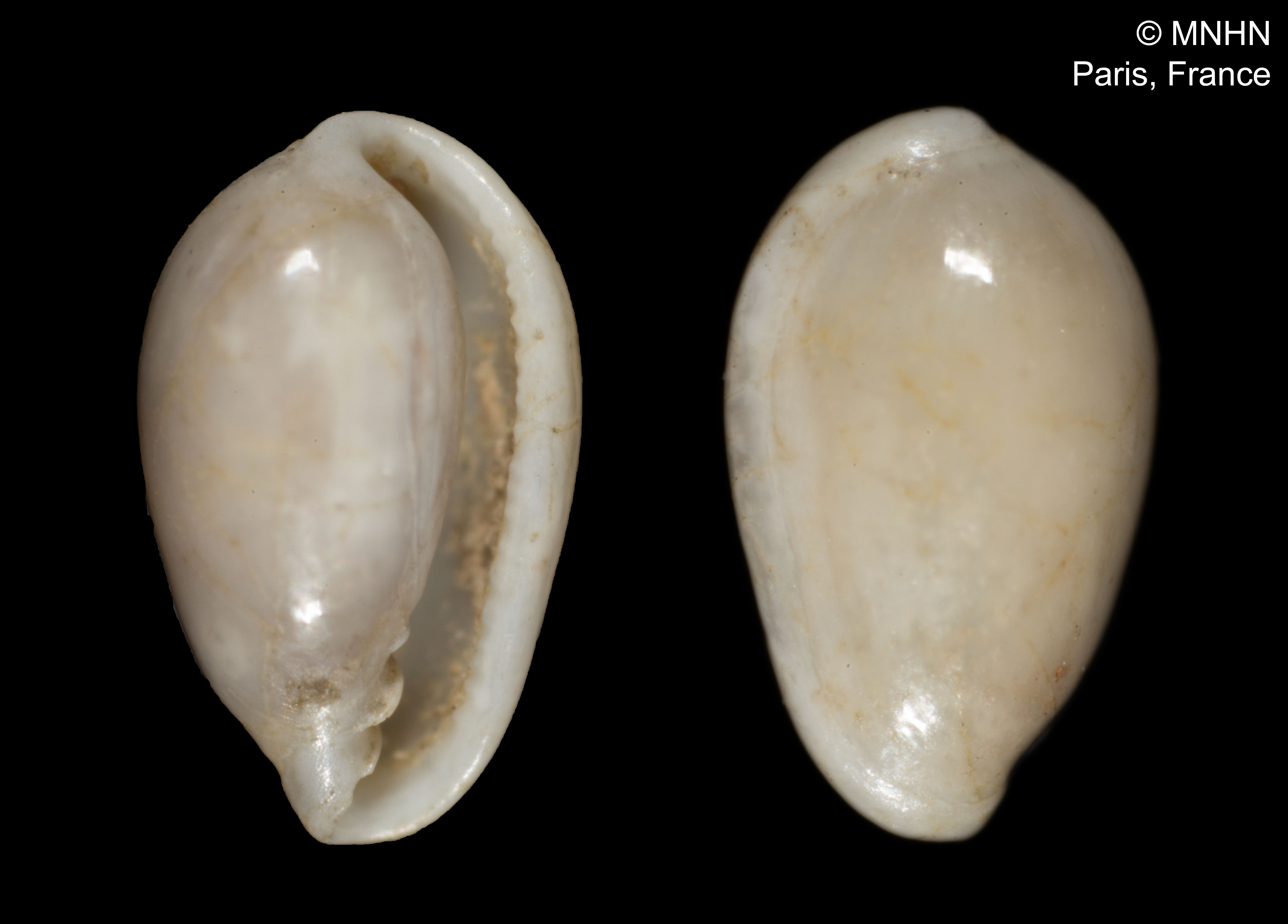
- Shell of Granulina occulta (syntype at MNHN, Paris)

Scientific classification
- Kingdom: Animalia
- Phylum: Mollusca
- Class: Gastropoda
- Subclass: Caenogastropoda
- Order: Neogastropoda
- Family: Granulinidae
- Genus: Granulina
- Species: G. occulta

Binomial name
- Granulina occulta (Monterosato, 1869)

Synonyms
- Gibberulina occulta (Monterosato, 1869); Marginella occulta Monterosato, 1869 (original combination); Marginella occulta var. minor Sturany, 1896 (dubious syn.); Volutella parvulina Locard, 1897; Volutella parvulina var. curta Locard, 1897

= Granulina occulta =

Species of gastropod

Granulina occulta is a species of very small sea snail, a marine gastropod mollusk or micromollusk in the family Granulinidae.

== Distribution ==
This species occurs in the Atlantic Ocean off Morocco.
