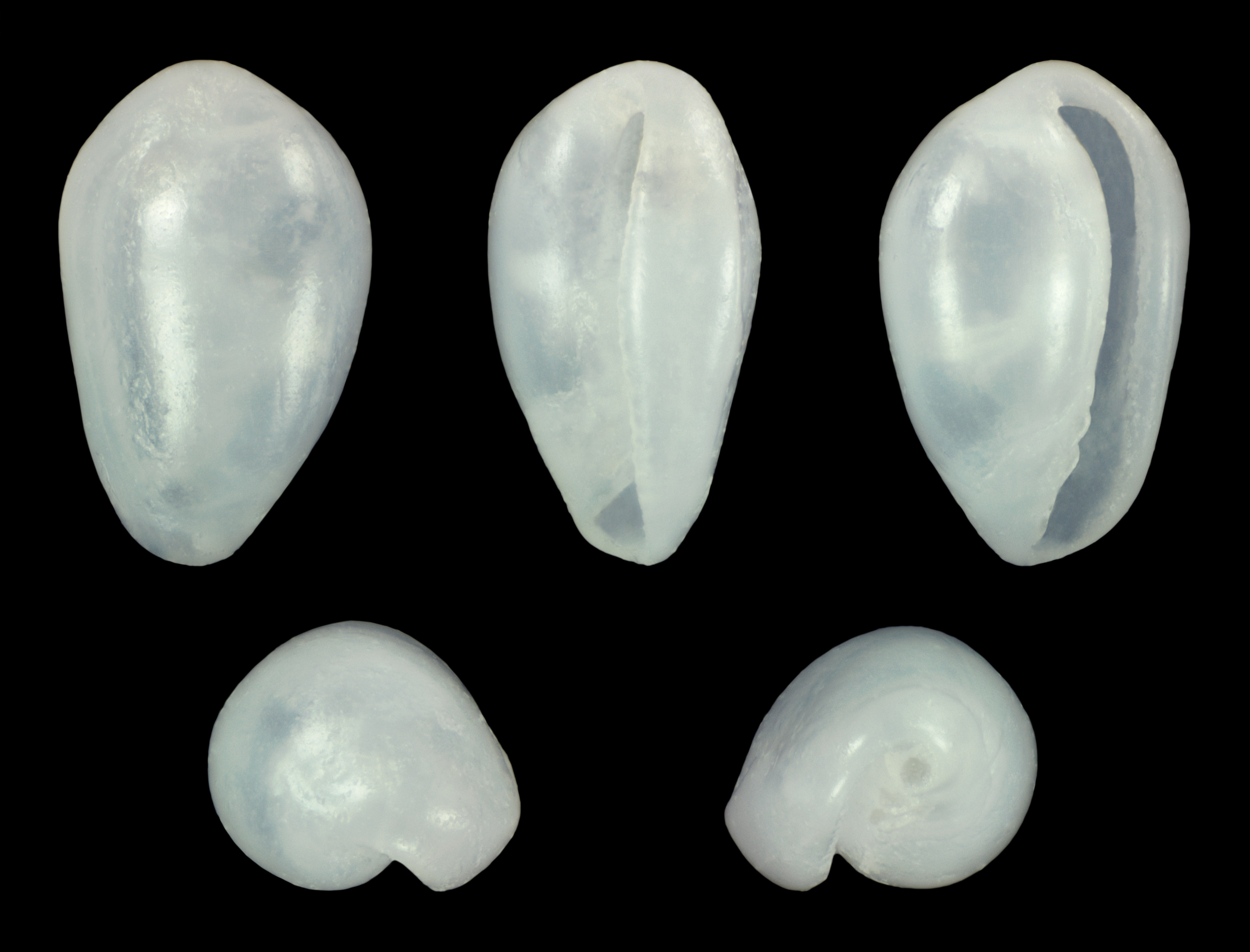

Scientific classification
- Kingdom: Animalia
- Phylum: Mollusca
- Class: Gastropoda
- Subclass: Caenogastropoda
- Order: Neogastropoda
- Family: Granulinidae
- Genus: Granulina
- Species: G. guancha

Binomial name
- Granulina guancha (d'Orbigny, 1840)

= Granulina guancha =

Species of gastropod

Granulina guancha is a species of very small sea snail, a marine gastropod mollusk or micromollusk in the family Granulinidae.
