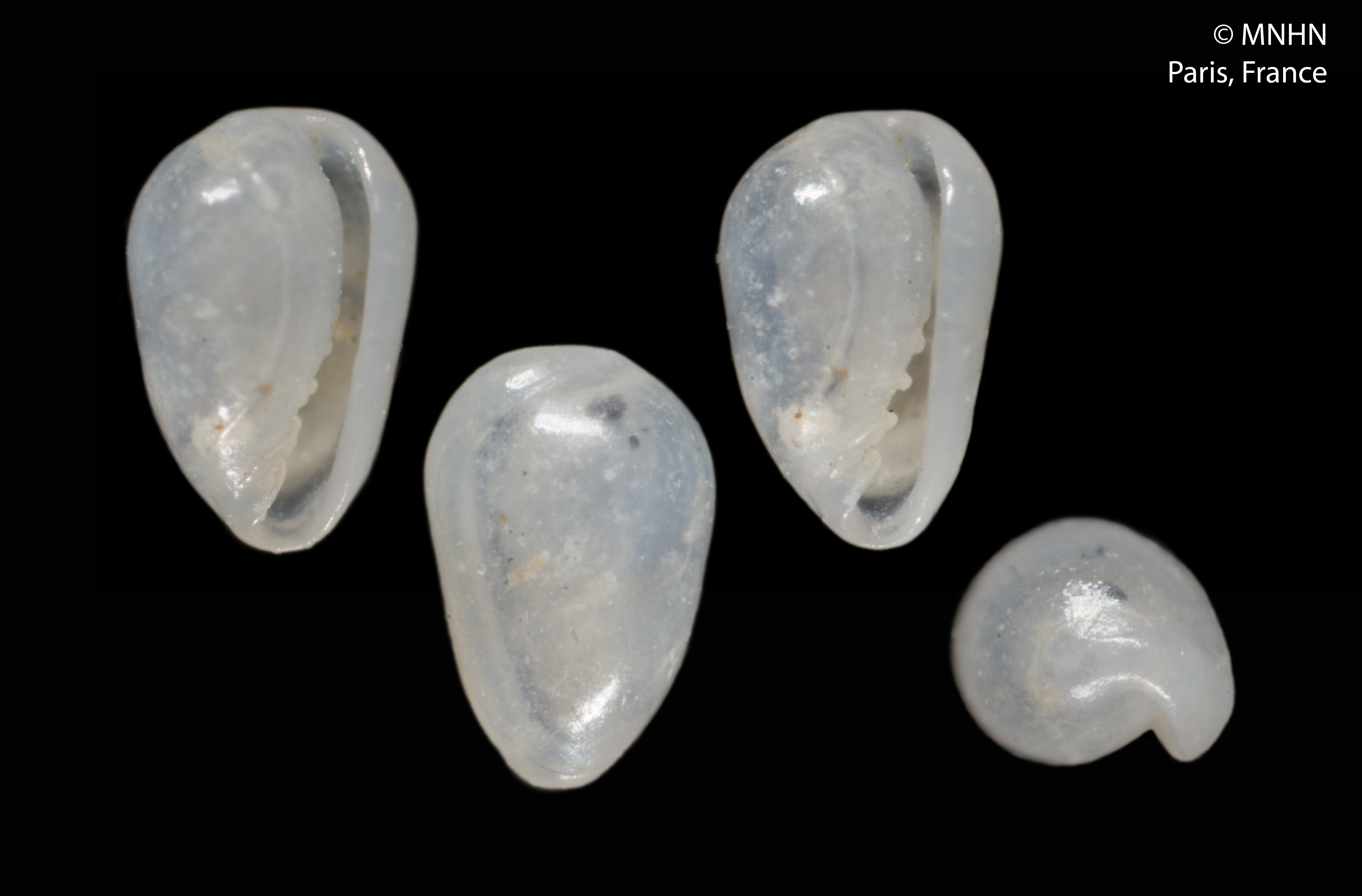
- Shell of Granulina liei (holotype at MNHN, Paris)

Scientific classification
- Kingdom: Animalia
- Phylum: Mollusca
- Class: Gastropoda
- Subclass: Caenogastropoda
- Order: Neogastropoda
- Family: Granulinidae
- Genus: Granulina
- Species: G. liei

Binomial name
- Granulina liei Bozzetti, 2008

= Granulina liei =

Species of gastropod

Granulina liei is a species of very small sea snail, a marine gastropod mollusk or micromollusk in the family Granulinidae.

== Distribution ==
This marine species occurs off Flores Island, Indonesia.
