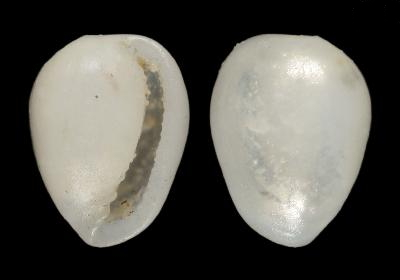
- Shell of Granulina isseli (syntype at MNHN, Paris)

Scientific classification
- Kingdom: Animalia
- Phylum: Mollusca
- Class: Gastropoda
- Subclass: Caenogastropoda
- Order: Neogastropoda
- Superfamily: Volutoidea
- Family: Granulinidae
- Genus: Granulina; Jousseaume, 1888

Type species
- Marginella pygmaea Issel, 1869

Synonyms
- † Cypraeolina Cerulli-Irelli, 1911; Cryptospira (Cypraeolina) Cerulli, 1911; Merovia Dall, 1921; Microginella Laseron, 1957

= Granulina =

Genus of gastropods

Granulina is a genus of minute sea snails, marine gastropod mollusks or micromollusks in the family Granulinidae.

== Species ==
Species within the genus Granulina include:

- Granulina africana Gofas, 1992
- Granulina agger (Watson, 1886)
- Granulina aidae Espinosa & Ortea, 2006
- Granulina amianta Dall, 1889
- Granulina anasantanae Ortea & Moro, 2019
- Granulina angeae Cossignani & Lorenz, 2020
- Granulina antillensis Jong & Coomans, 1988
- Granulina anxia Hedley, 1909
- Granulina atomella (Bavay, 1917)
- Granulina aubryi Cossignani & Lorenz, 2020
- Granulina benitoi Espinosa & Ortea, 2014
- Granulina boal Ortea, 2023
- Granulina boucheti Gofas, 1992
- Granulina boyeri Bonfitto & Smriglio, 2019
- Granulina calla McCleery, 2010
- Granulina calypso Espinosa & Ortea, 2019
- Granulina canariensis Boyer, 2001
- Granulina cartagenaensis McCleery, 2010
- Granulina cartwrighti Sowerby I, 1915
- Granulina cerea Smeriglio, Gubbioli & Mariottini, 2000
- †Granulina clandestina (Brocchi, 1814)
- Granulina clandestinella Bavay, 1908
- Granulina colonensis McCleery, 2010
- Granulina crassa Smeriglio, Gubbioli & Mariottini, 2000
- Granulina crystallina Smeriglio, Gubbioli & Mariottini, 2000
- Granulina cylindrata Boyer & Rolan, 2004
- Granulina darienensis McCleery, 2010
- † Granulina detruncata La Perna, Landau & Marquet, 2001
- Granulina dianae Lussi & G. Smith, 2015
- Granulina eideri Espinosa & Ortea, 2014
- Granulina elliottae Cotton, 1944
- Granulina elliptica La Perna, 2000
- Granulina falsijaponica Habe, 1957
- Granulina fernandesi Boyer & Rolan, 1999
- Granulina gayracaensis McCleery, 2010
- Granulina ghanensis Rolan & Fernandes, 1997
- Granulina globosa Wakefield & McCleery, 2004
- Granulina gofasi Smriglio & Mariottini, 1996
- Granulina gozon Ortea, 2023
- Granulina granatensis McCleery, 2010
- Granulina gradata Boyer, 2018
- Granulina granatensis McCleery, 2010
- Granulina grandas Ortea, 2023
- Granulina grata Thiele, 1925
- Granulina guanajatabey Espinosa & Ortea, 2003
- Granulina guancha (d'Orbigny, 1840)
- Granulina gubbiolii (Smriglio & Mariottini, 1996)
- Granulina guttula (La Perna, 1999)
- Granulina hadria (Dall, 1889)
- Granulina hedleyi Boyer, 2003
- Granulina hubertorum T. Cossignani & Lorenz, 2021
- † Granulina iberica La Perna, Landau & Marquet, 2001
- Granulina illano Ortea, 2023
- Granulina iridisa McCleery, 2010
- Granulina isseli Nevill & Nevill, 1875
- Granulina keilori Espinosa & Ortea, 2019
- Granulina lagrifa Espinosa, Fernandez-Garcês & Ortea, 2004
- Granulina lapernai Smriglio & Mariottini, 2013
- Granulina lawsonae Lussi & Smith, 1998
- Granulina lazaroi Espinosa & Ortea, 2006
- Granulina liei Bozzetti, 2008
- † Granulina longa La Perna, Landau & Marquet, 2001
- Granulina luizae Ortea & Moro, 2020
- Granulina magagnai Espinosa & Ortea, 2019
- † Granulina malacitana La Perna, Landau & Marquet, 2001
- Granulina mamanucensis Wakefield & McCleery, 2004
- Granulina margaritula Carpenter, 1857
- Granulina marginata (Bivona, 1832)
- Granulina mariei (Crosse, 1867)
- Granulina mauretanica Gofas, 1992
- Granulina mediterranea Landau, La Perna & Marquet, 2006
- Granulina melitensis (Smriglio, Mariottini & Rufini, 1998)
- Granulina minitica Espinosa & Ortea, 2019
- Granulina minae Espinosa & Ortea, 2000
- Granulina minitica Espinosa & Ortea, 2019
- Granulina minusculina (Locard, 1897)
- Granulina molinai Espinosa & Ortea, 2006
- Granulina monjesensis McCleery, 2010
- Granulina morassii Bonfitto & Smriglio, 2019
- Granulina nebulosa Boyer, 2018
- Granulina nivalis McCleery, 2010
- Granulina nofronii Smeriglio, Gubbioli & Mariottini, 2000
- Granulina nympha Brazier, 1894
- Granulina ocarina Fernandes, 1988
- Granulina occulta (Monterosato, 1869)
- Granulina ocella McCleery, 2010
- Granulina oneili Espinosa & Ortea, 2014
- Granulina opima (Laseron, 1957)
- Granulina ovata McCleery, 2010
- Granulina ovuliformis d'Orbigny 1841
- Granulina parilis Gofas & Fernandes, 1988
- Granulina perminima Sowerby III, 1894
- Granulina pesoz Ortea, 2023
- Granulina philpoppei Cossignani, 2006
- Granulina pierrepineaui Pin & Boyer, 1995
- Granulina pinguisa McCleery, 2010
- Granulina pirazzinii Cossignani & Lorenz, 2018
- Granulina plagula McCleery, 2010
- Granulina producera McCleery, 2010
- Granulina pruinosa Boyer, 2003
- Granulina pulvis Jousseaume, 1875
- Granulina pruinosa Boyer, 2003
- Granulina pusaterii Smriglio & Mariottini in Giannuzzi-Savelli et al., 2003
- Granulina pyriformis (Carpenter, 1865)
- Granulina rosea Boyer, 2018
- Granulina rutae Ortea Rato, Abad & Barrios, 2008
- Granulina scutulata Boyer, 2018
- Granulina tantilla (Gould, 1860)
- Granulina tenuilabiata La Perna, 1999
- Granulina tinolia (Dall, 1927)
- Granulina tobagoensis McCleery, 2010
- Granulina torosa Gofas, 1992
- Granulina truncata Dall, 1927
- Granulina turbiniformis (Bavay, 1917)
- Granulina vagger Watson, 1886
- Granulina vanhareni (van Aartsen, M. & G., 1984)
- Granulina velaensis McCleery, 2010
- Granulina vitrea Laseron, 1957
- Granulina volcana McCleery, 2010
- Granulina waltergomezi McCleery, 2010

Species brought into synonymy

- Granulina alfredensis (Bartsch, 1915): synonym of Plesiocystiscus alfredensis (Bartsch, 1915)
- Granulina algoensis (E. A. Smith, 1901): synonym of Crithe algoensis (E. A. Smith, 1901)
- Granulina aphanospira (Tomlin, 1913): synonym of Plesiocystiscus aphanospira (Tomlin, 1913)
- Granulina atlantidea Boyer, 2016: synonym of Granulinopsis atlantidea (Boyer, 2016) (original combination)
- Granulina bougei Bavay, 1917: synonym of Cystiscus bougei (Bavay, 1917)
- Granulina guttula La Perna, 1999: synonym of Granulina mediterranea Landau, La Perna & Marquet, 2006
- Granulina guttula (Sowerby I, 1832): synonym of Hydroginella guttula (Sowerby I, 1832)
- Granulina horikosii Habe, 1951: synonym of Granulina tantilla (Gould, 1860)
- Granulina microgonia (Dall, 1927): synonym of Cystiscus microgonia (Dall, 1927)
- Granulina pseustes (E.A. Smith, 1904): synonym of Cystiscus pseustes (E.A. Smith, 1904)
- Granulina thalia (Turton, 1932): synonym of Plesiocystiscus thalia (W. Turton, 1932)
- Granulina zanclea Bogi, Boyer, Renda & Giacobbe, 2016 : synonym of Granulinopsis zanclea (Bogi, Boyer, Renda & Giacobbe, 2016) (original combination)
