= Granulina lawsonae =

Scientific classification
- Kingdom: Animalia
- Phylum: Mollusca
- Class: Gastropoda
- Subclass: Caenogastropoda
- Order: Neogastropoda
- Family: Granulinidae
- Genus: Granulina
- Species: G. lawsonae

Binomial name
- Granulina lawsonae Lussi & Smith, 1998

Species of gastropod

Granulina lawsonae is a species of very small sea snail, a marine gastropod mollusk or micromollusk in the family Granulinidae.
