= Pugnus margaritella =

Scientific classification
- Kingdom: Animalia
- Phylum: Mollusca
- Class: Gastropoda
- Subclass: Caenogastropoda
- Order: Neogastropoda
- Family: Granulinidae
- Genus: Pugnus
- Species: P. margaritella

Binomial name
- Pugnus margaritella Faber, 2006

Species of gastropod

Pugnus margaritella is a species of very small sea snail, a marine gastropod mollusk or micromollusk in the family Granulinidae.
