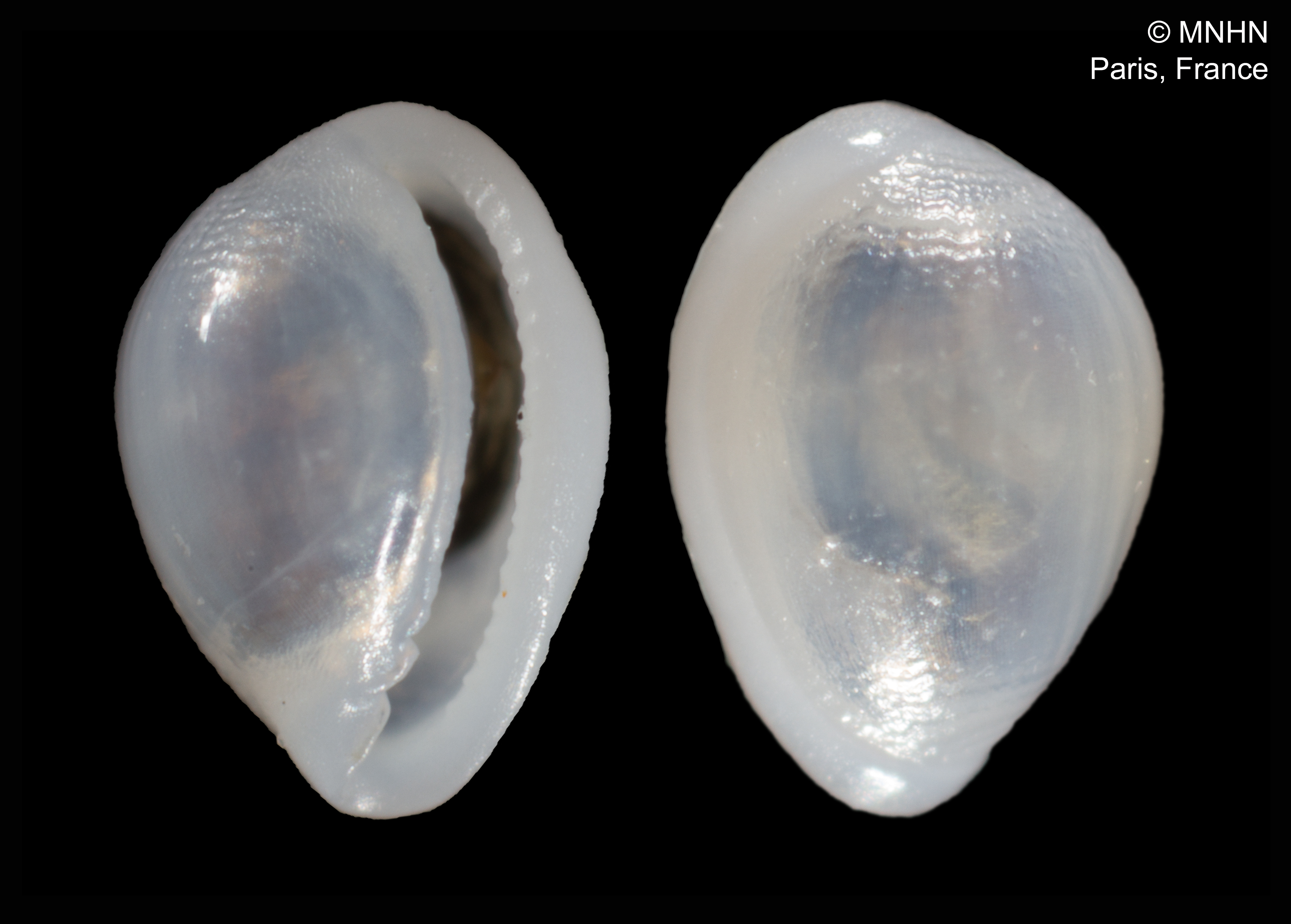
- Shell of Granulina hedleyi (holotype at MNHN, Paris)

Scientific classification
- Kingdom: Animalia
- Phylum: Mollusca
- Class: Gastropoda
- Subclass: Caenogastropoda
- Order: Neogastropoda
- Family: Granulinidae
- Genus: Granulina
- Species: G. hedleyi

Binomial name
- Granulina hedleyi Boyer, 2003

= Granulina hedleyi =

Species of gastropod

Granulina hedleyi is a species of very small sea snail, a marine gastropod mollusk or micromollusk in the family Granulinidae.

== Distribution ==
This marine species occurs off New Caledonia.
