= Paolaura maldivensis =

Scientific classification
- Kingdom: Animalia
- Phylum: Mollusca
- Class: Gastropoda
- Subclass: Caenogastropoda
- Order: Neogastropoda
- Family: Granulinidae
- Genus: Paolaura
- Species: P. maldivensis

Binomial name
- Paolaura maldivensis Smriglio & Mariottini, 2001

Species of gastropod

Paolaura maldivensis is a species of very small sea snail, a marine gastropod mollusk or micromollusk in the family Granulinidae. The species was first described by Smriglio and Mariottini in 2001.
