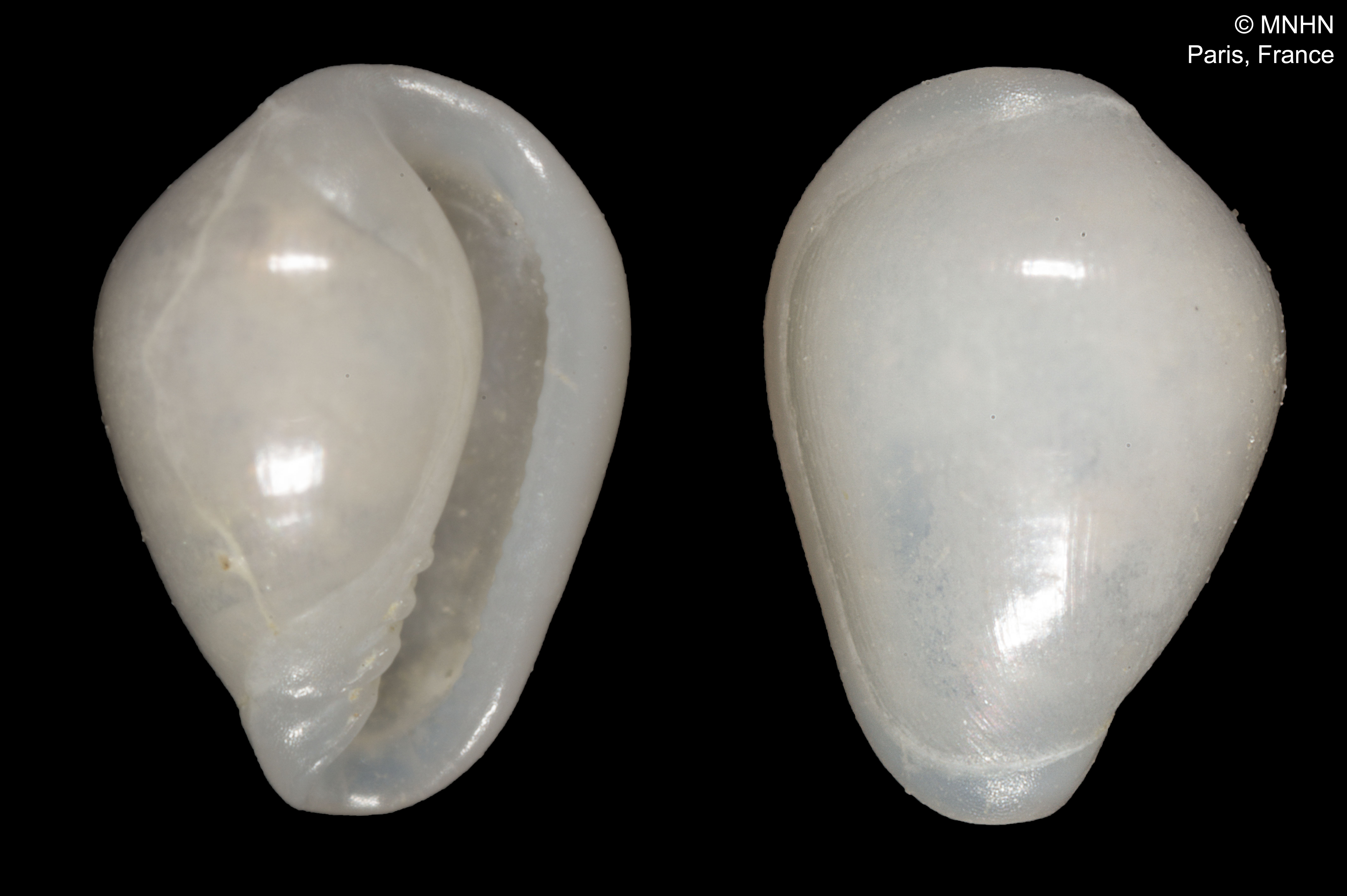
- Shell of Granulina canariensis (holotype at MNHN, Paris)

Scientific classification
- Kingdom: Animalia
- Phylum: Mollusca
- Class: Gastropoda
- Subclass: Caenogastropoda
- Order: Neogastropoda
- Family: Granulinidae
- Genus: Granulina
- Species: G. canariensis

Binomial name
- Granulina canariensis Boyer, 2001

= Granulina canariensis =

Species of gastropod

Granulina canariensis is a species of very small sea snail, a marine gastropod mollusk or micromollusk in the family Granulinidae.

== Distribution ==
This species occurs in the Atlantic Ocean off the Canary Islands.
