= Granulina melitensis =

Scientific classification
- Kingdom: Animalia
- Phylum: Mollusca
- Class: Gastropoda
- Subclass: Caenogastropoda
- Order: Neogastropoda
- Family: Granulinidae
- Genus: Granulina
- Species: G. melitensis

Binomial name
- Granulina melitensis (Smriglio, Mariottini & Rufini, 1998)

Species of gastropod

Granulina melitensis is a species of very small sea snail, a marine gastropod mollusk or micromollusk in the family Granulinidae.

== Description ==
Granulina melitensis is a round mollusk, that looks similar to a sea shell. Common images show it as white, or shades of purple, pink, and in between.
