= Paolaura cancellata =

Scientific classification
- Kingdom: Animalia
- Phylum: Mollusca
- Class: Gastropoda
- Subclass: Caenogastropoda
- Order: Neogastropoda
- Family: Granulinidae
- Genus: Paolaura
- Species: P. cancellata

Binomial name
- Paolaura cancellata Boyer, 2018

Species of gastropod

Paolaura cancellata is a species of very small sea snail, a marine gastropod mollusk or micromollusk in the family Granulinidae.

== Distribution ==
This marine species occurs off Oman.
