= Granulina nofronii =

Scientific classification
- Kingdom: Animalia
- Phylum: Mollusca
- Class: Gastropoda
- Subclass: Caenogastropoda
- Order: Neogastropoda
- Family: Granulinidae
- Genus: Granulina
- Species: G. nofronii

Binomial name
- Granulina nofronii Smriglio, Gubbioli & Mariottini, 2000

Species of gastropod

Granulina nofronii is a species of very small sea snail, a marine gastropod mollusk or micromollusk in the family Granulinidae.
