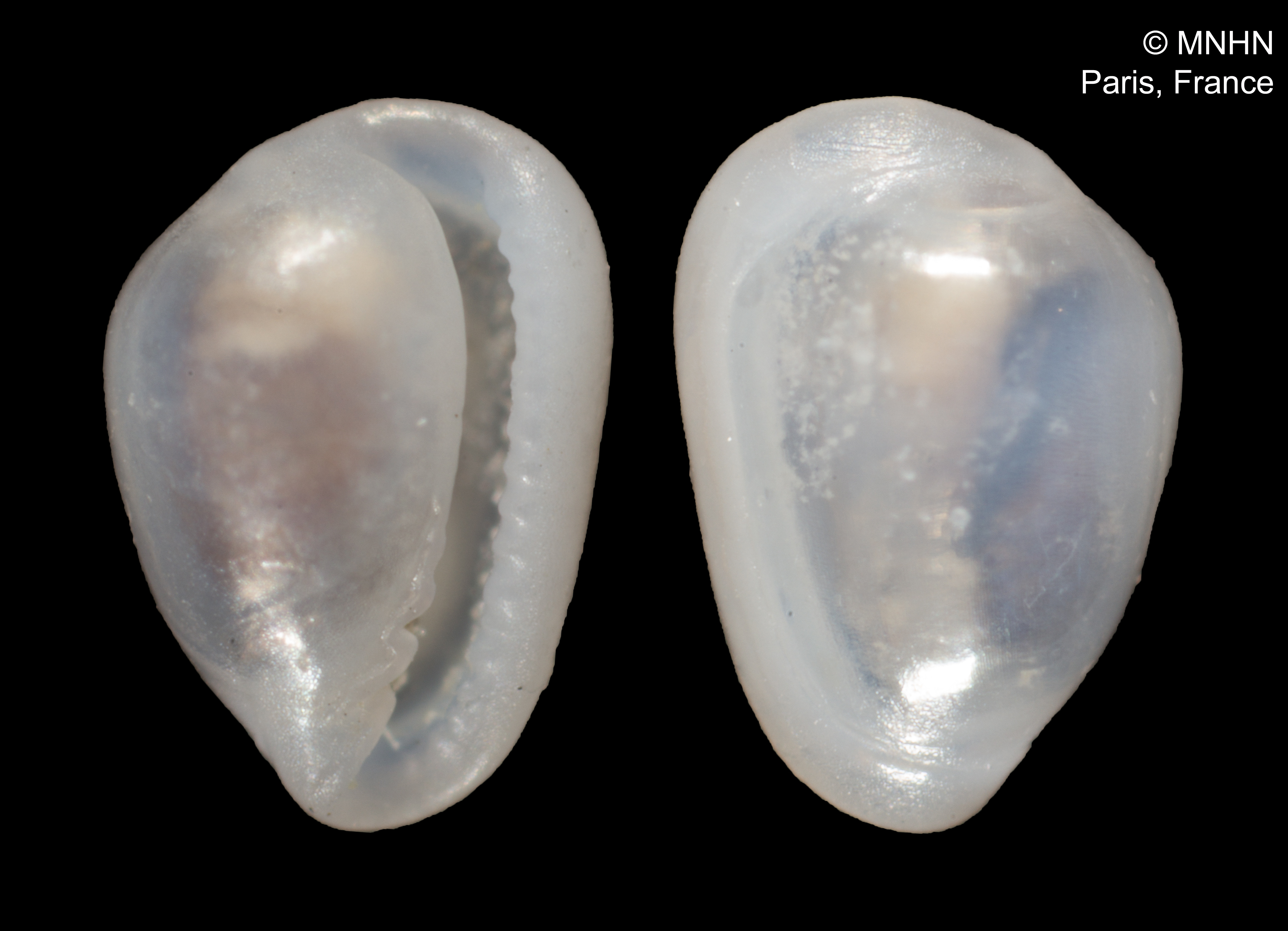
- Shell of Granulina parilis (holotype at MNHN, Paris)

Conservation status
- Data Deficient (IUCN 2.3)

Scientific classification
- Kingdom: Animalia
- Phylum: Mollusca
- Class: Gastropoda
- Subclass: Caenogastropoda
- Order: Neogastropoda
- Family: Granulinidae
- Genus: Granulina
- Species: G. parilis

Binomial name
- Granulina parilis Gofas & Fernandes, 1988

= Granulina parilis =

Species of gastropod

Granulina parilis is a species of small sea snail, a marine gastropod mollusk in the family Granulinidae.

== Distribution ==
This species is endemic to São Tomé and Príncipe.
