= Pugnus =

Scientific classification
- Kingdom: Animalia
- Phylum: Mollusca
- Class: Gastropoda
- Subclass: Caenogastropoda
- Order: Neogastropoda
- Superfamily: Volutoidea
- Family: Granulinidae
- Genus: Pugnus; Hedley, 1896

Type species
- Pugnus parvus Hedley, 1869

Synonyms
- Marginellopsis Bavay, 1911

Genus of gastropods

Pugnus is a genus of very small sea snails, marine gastropod mollusks or micromollusks in the family Granulinidae.

== Species ==
Species within the genus Pugnus include:

- Pugnus lachrimula (Gould, 1862)
- Pugnus maesae Roth, 1972
- Pugnus margaritella Faber, 2006
- Pugnus mirbatensis Cossignani & Lorenz, 2018
- Pugnus parvus Hedley, 1896
- Pugnus tarasconii Rios, 2009

Species brought into synonymy

- Pugnus serrei (Bavay, 1911): synonym of Marginellopsis serrei Bavay, 1911
