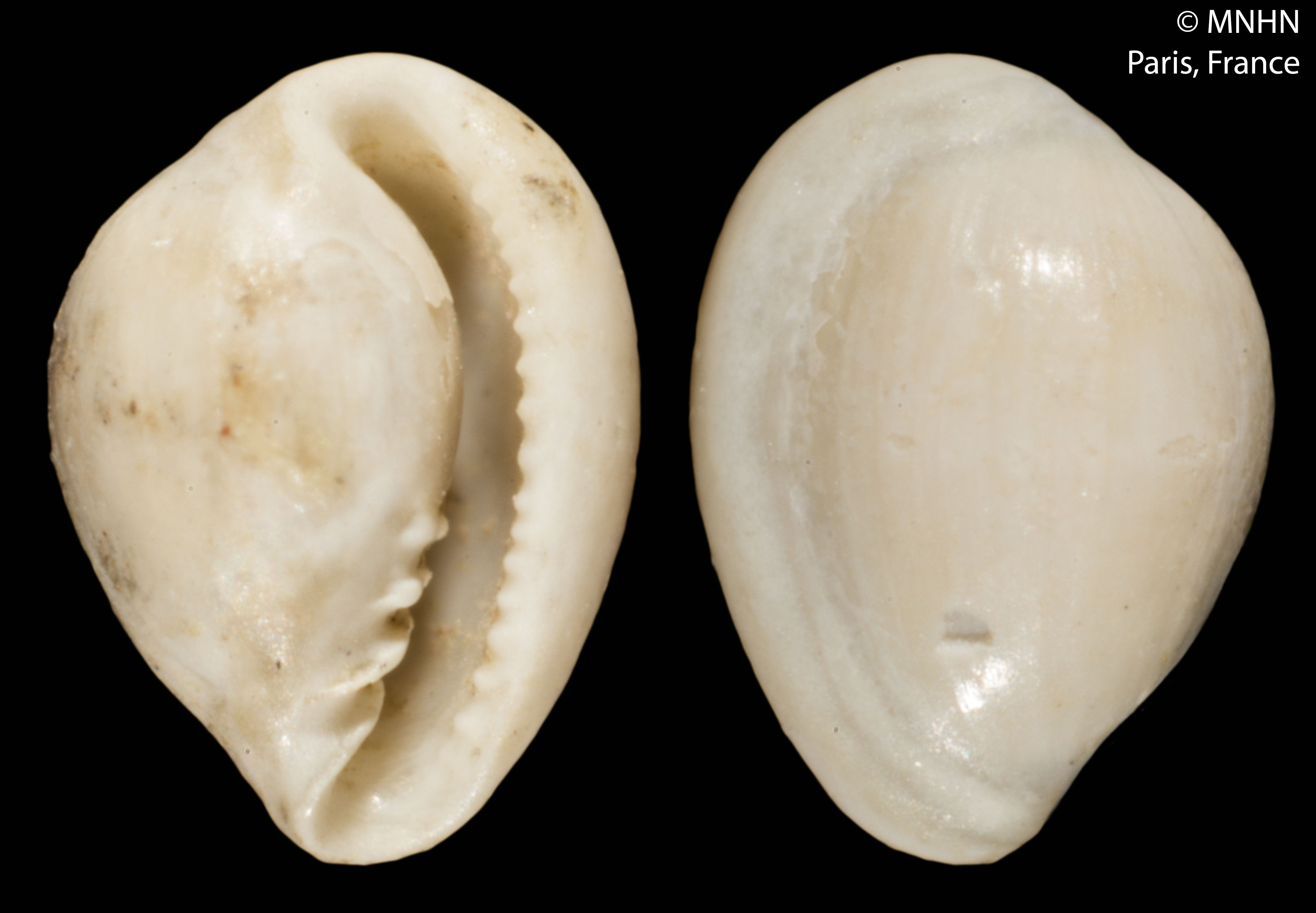
- Shell of Granulina minusculina (lectotype at MNHN, Paris)

Scientific classification
- Kingdom: Animalia
- Phylum: Mollusca
- Class: Gastropoda
- Subclass: Caenogastropoda
- Order: Neogastropoda
- Family: Granulinidae
- Genus: Granulina
- Species: G. minusculina

Binomial name
- Granulina minusculina (Locard, 1897)

Synonyms
- Granulina gubbiolii Smriglio & Mariottini, 1999; Volutella minusculina Locard, 1897 (original combination)

= Granulina minusculina =

Species of gastropod

Granulina minusculina is a species of very small sea snail, a marine gastropod mollusk or micromollusk in the family Granulinidae. Its original name is volutella minusculina locard.

== Description ==
The length of the shell attains 1.9 mm.

== Distribution ==
This species occurs in the Atlantic Ocean off Morocco.
