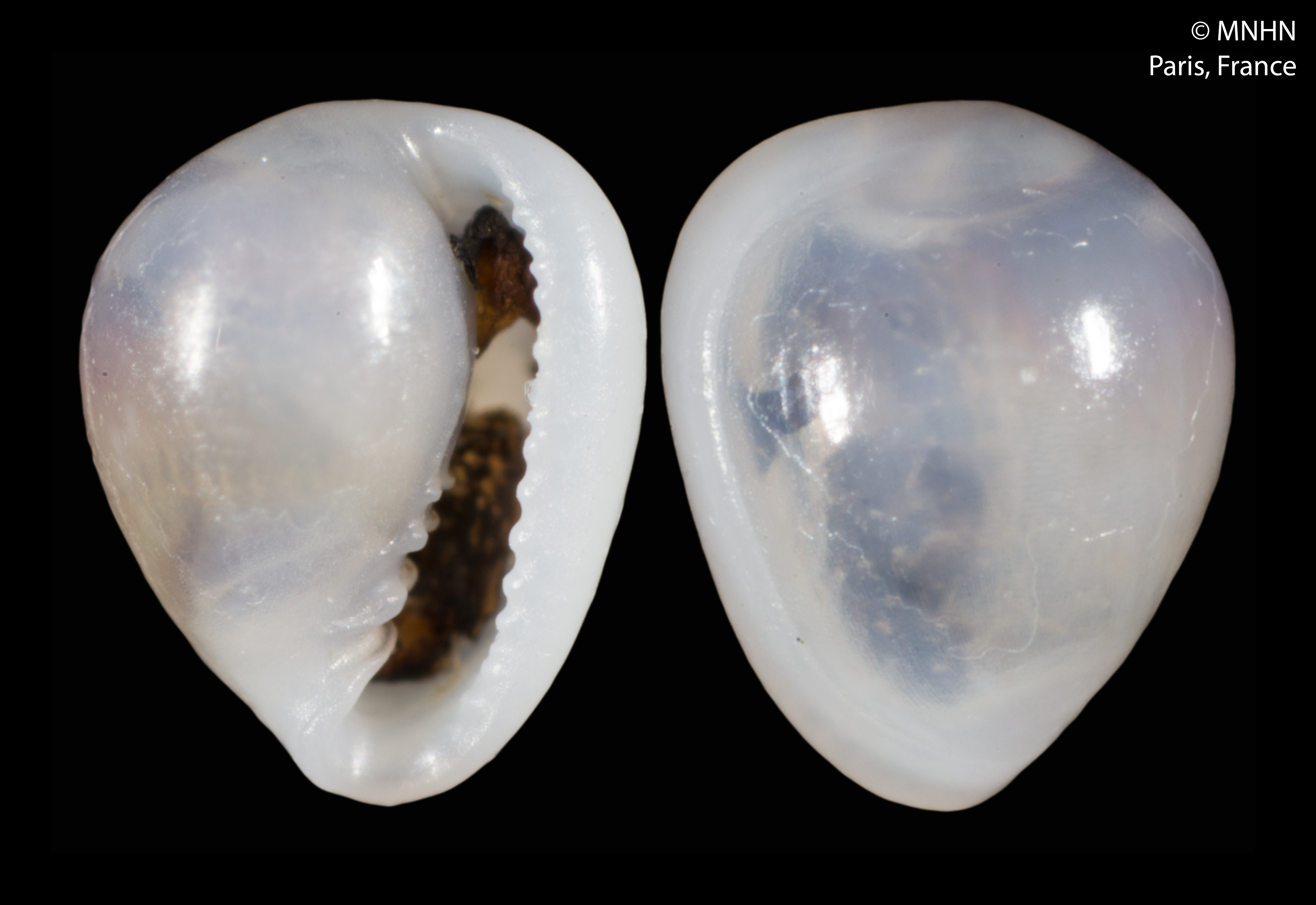
- Shell of Granulina marginata (neotype at MNHN, Paris)

Scientific classification
- Kingdom: Animalia
- Phylum: Mollusca
- Class: Gastropoda
- Subclass: Caenogastropoda
- Order: Neogastropoda
- Superfamily: Volutoidea
- Family: Granulinidae
- Genus: Granulina
- Species: G. marginata

Binomial name
- Granulina marginata (Bivona, 1832)

Synonyms
- Gibberulina clandestina (Brocchi, 1814) sensu Monterosato, 1884 (misidentified species and inappropriate generic combination); Voluta brocchi Scacchi, 1833; Volvaria marginata Bivona, 1832 (original combination)

= Granulina marginata =

Species of gastropod

Granulina marginata is a species of very small sea snail, a marine gastropod mollusk or micromollusk in the family Granulinidae.

== Description ==
The length of the shell attains 1.9 mm.

== Distribution ==
This species occurs in the Mediterranean Sea off Sicily.
