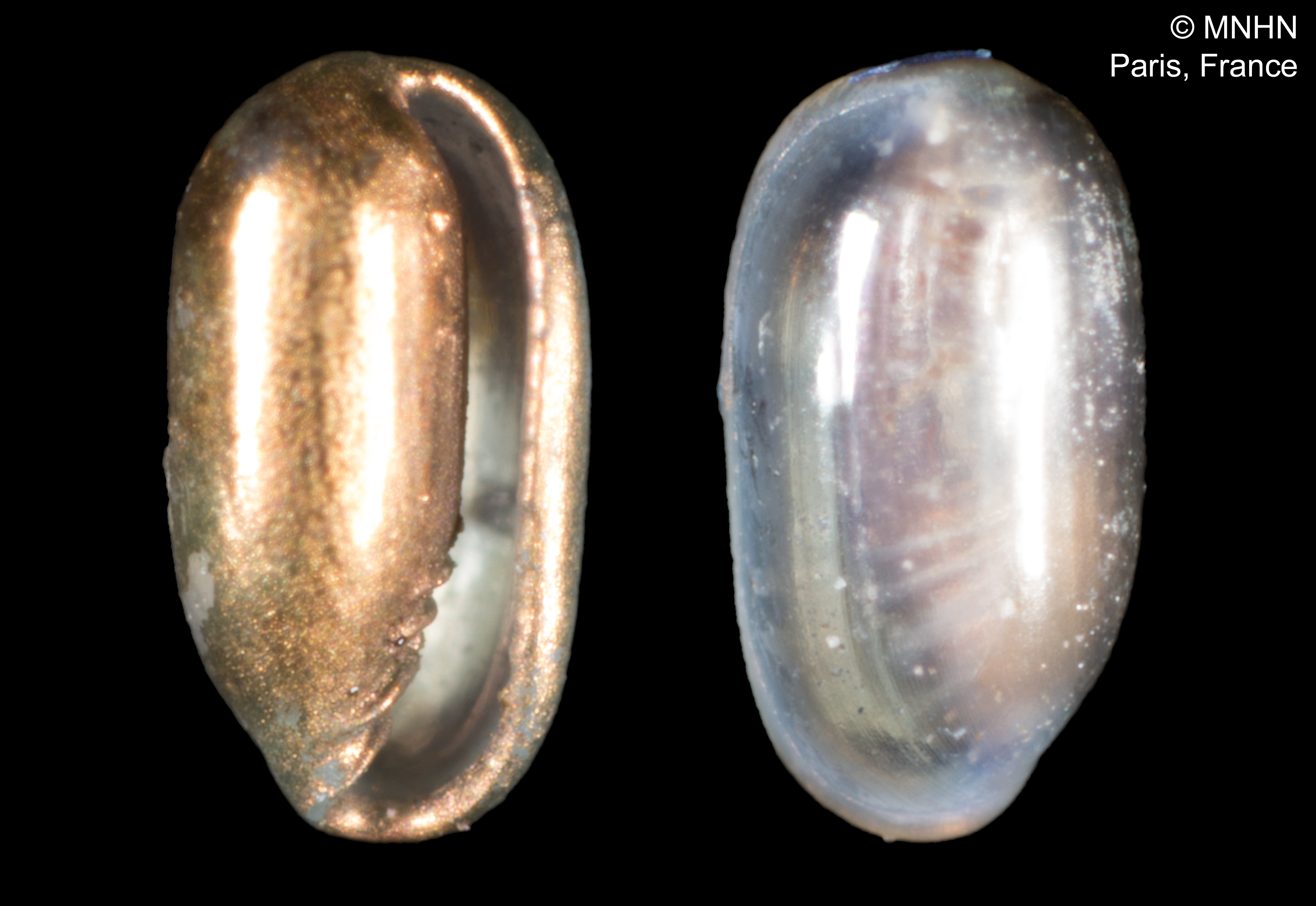
- Shell of Granulinopsis cylindrata (holotype at MNHN, Paris)

Scientific classification
- Domain: Eukaryota
- Kingdom: Animalia
- Phylum: Mollusca
- Class: Gastropoda
- Subclass: Caenogastropoda
- Order: Neogastropoda
- Superfamily: Volutoidea
- Family: Granulinidae
- Genus: Granulinopsis; Boyer, 2017

Type species
- Granulina cylindrata Boyer & Rolán, 2004

= Granulinopsis =

Genus of gastropods

Granulinopsis is a genus of minute sea snails, marine gastropod mollusks or micromollusks in the family Granulinidae.

== Species ==
- Granulinopsis atlantidea (Boyer, 2016)
- Granulinopsis cylindrata (Boyer & Rolán, 2004)
- Granulinopsis zanclea (Bogi, Boyer, Renda & Giacobbe, 2016)
