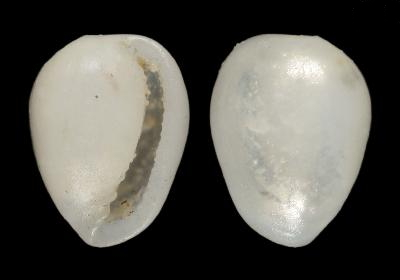
- Shell of Granulina isseli (syntype at MNHN, Paris)

Scientific classification
- Kingdom: Animalia
- Phylum: Mollusca
- Class: Gastropoda
- Subclass: Caenogastropoda
- Order: Neogastropoda
- Superfamily: Volutoidea
- Family: Granulinidae
- Genus: Granulina
- Species: G. isseli

Binomial name
- Granulina isseli Nevill & Nevill, 1875

Synonyms
- Marginella isseli G. Nevill & H. Nevill, 1875 (original combination); Marginella pygmaea Issel, 1869 (Invalid: junior homonym of Marginella pygmaea G.B. Sowerby II, 1846; M. isseli is a replacement name)

= Granulina isseli =

Species of gastropod

Granulina isseli is a species of very small sea snail, a marine gastropod mollusk or micromollusk in the family Granulinidae.

== Distribution ==
This species occurs in the Red Sea off Egypt.
