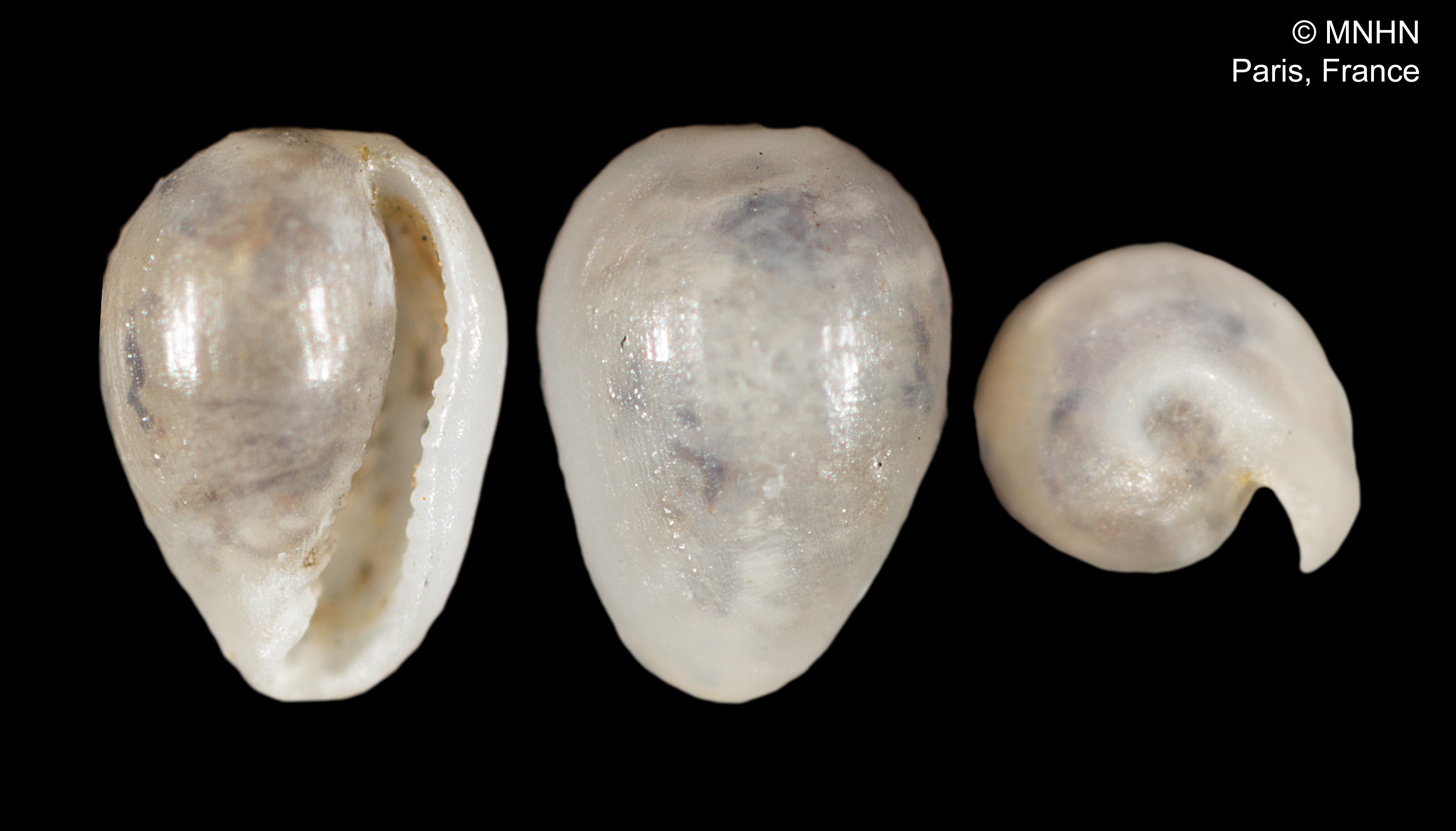
- Shell of Marginellopsis pulvis (syntype at MNHN, Paris)

Scientific classification
- Kingdom: Animalia
- Phylum: Mollusca
- Class: Gastropoda
- Subclass: Caenogastropoda
- Order: Neogastropoda
- Superfamily: Volutoidea
- Family: Granulinidae
- Genus: Marginellopsis; Bavay, 1911

Type species
- Marginellopsis serrei Bavay, 1911

= Marginellopsis =

Genus of gastropods

Marginellopsis is a genus of very small sea snails, marine gastropod mollusks or micromollusks in the family Granulinidae.

== Species ==
Species within the genus Marginellopsis include:

- Marginellopsis herosae Bonfitto & Smriglio, 2019
- Marginellopsis jamaicensis Cossignani & Lorenz, 2019
- Marginellopsis margaritella (Faber, 2006)
- Marginellopsis pulvis (Jousseaume, 1875)
- Marginellopsis rineri Ortea, 2020
- Marginellopsis serrei Bavay, 1911

Species brought into synonymy

- Marginellopsis marondei F. Riedel, 2000: synonym of Pugnus serrei (Bavay, 1911) accepted as Marginellopsis serrei Bavay, 1911
