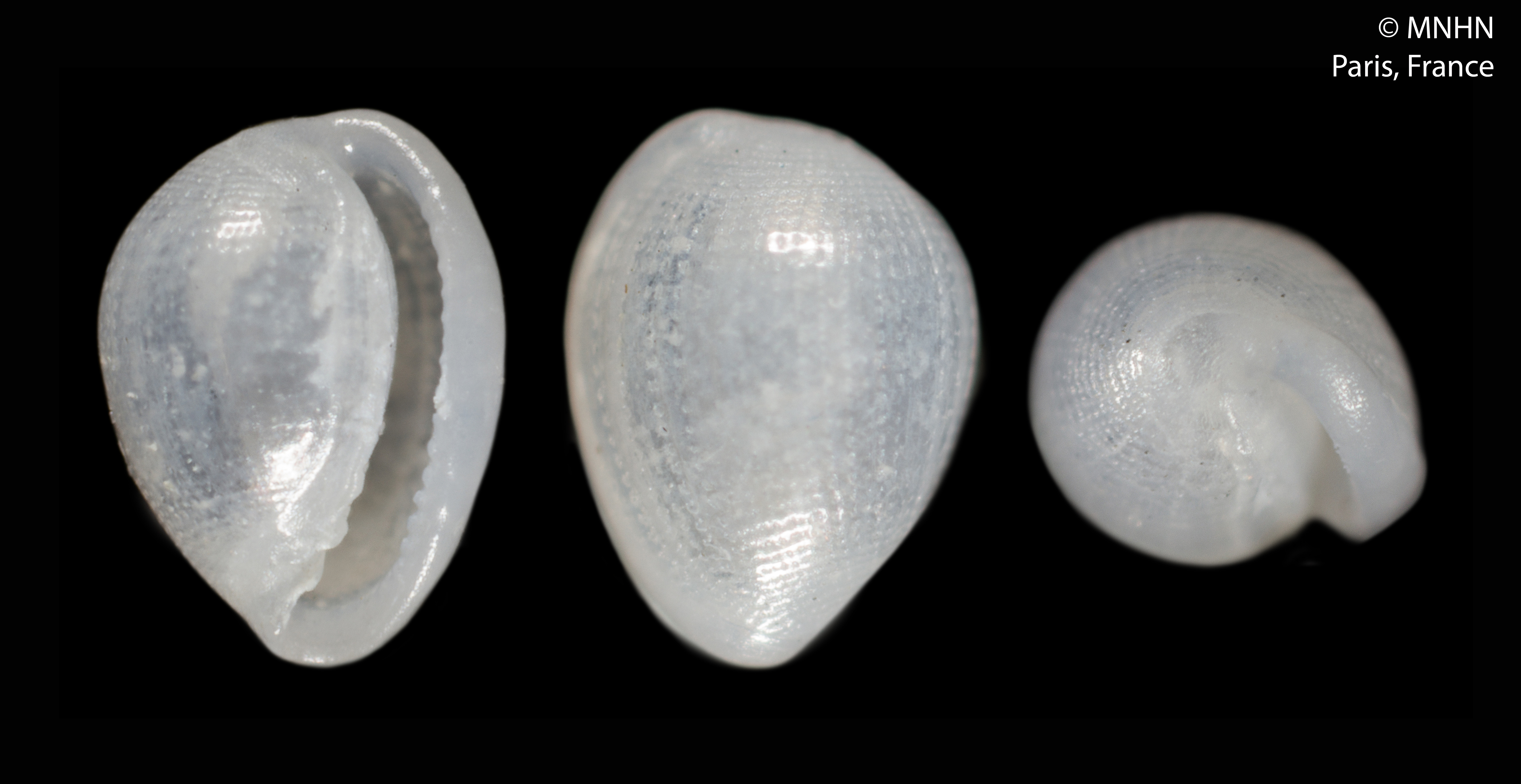
- Shell of Paolaura kloosi

Scientific classification
- Kingdom: Animalia
- Phylum: Mollusca
- Class: Gastropoda
- Subclass: Caenogastropoda
- Order: Neogastropoda
- Superfamily: Volutoidea
- Family: Granulinidae
- Genus: Paolaura; Smriglio & Mariottini, 2001

Type species
- Paolaura semistriata Smriglio & Mariottini, 2001

= Paolaura =

Genus of gastropods

Paolaura is a genus of very small sea snails, marine gastropod mollusks or micromollusks in the family Granulinidae.

== Species ==
Species within the genus Paolaura include:

- Paolaura cancellata Boyer, 2018
- Paolaura kenyaensis Smriglio & Mariottini, 2001
- Paolaura kloosi Bozzetti, 2009
- Paolaura maldivensis Smriglio & Mariottini, 2001
- Paolaura semistriata Smiriglio & Mariottini, 2001
