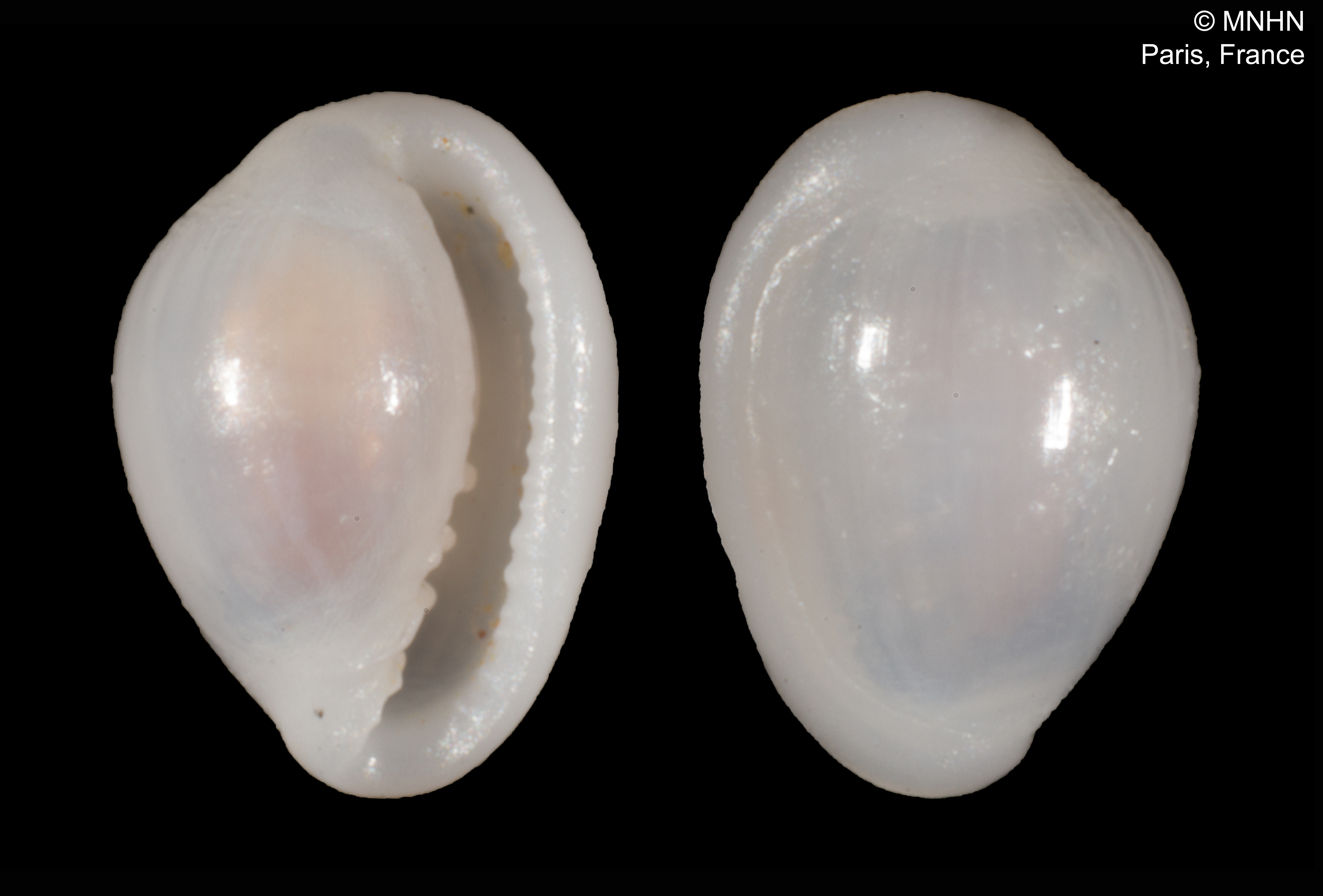
- Shell of Granulinella pruinosa (holotype at MNHN, Paris)

Scientific classification
- Domain: Eukaryota
- Kingdom: Animalia
- Phylum: Mollusca
- Class: Gastropoda
- Subclass: Caenogastropoda
- Order: Neogastropoda
- Superfamily: Volutoidea
- Family: Granulinidae
- Genus: Granulinella; Boyer, 2017

Type species
- Granulina pruinosa Boyer, 2003

= Granulinella =

Genus of gastropods

Granulinella is a genus of minute sea snails, marine gastropod mollusks or micromollusks in the family Granulinidae.

== Species ==
- Granulinella pruinosa (Boyer, 2003) (synonym: Granulina pruinosa Boyer, 2003)
