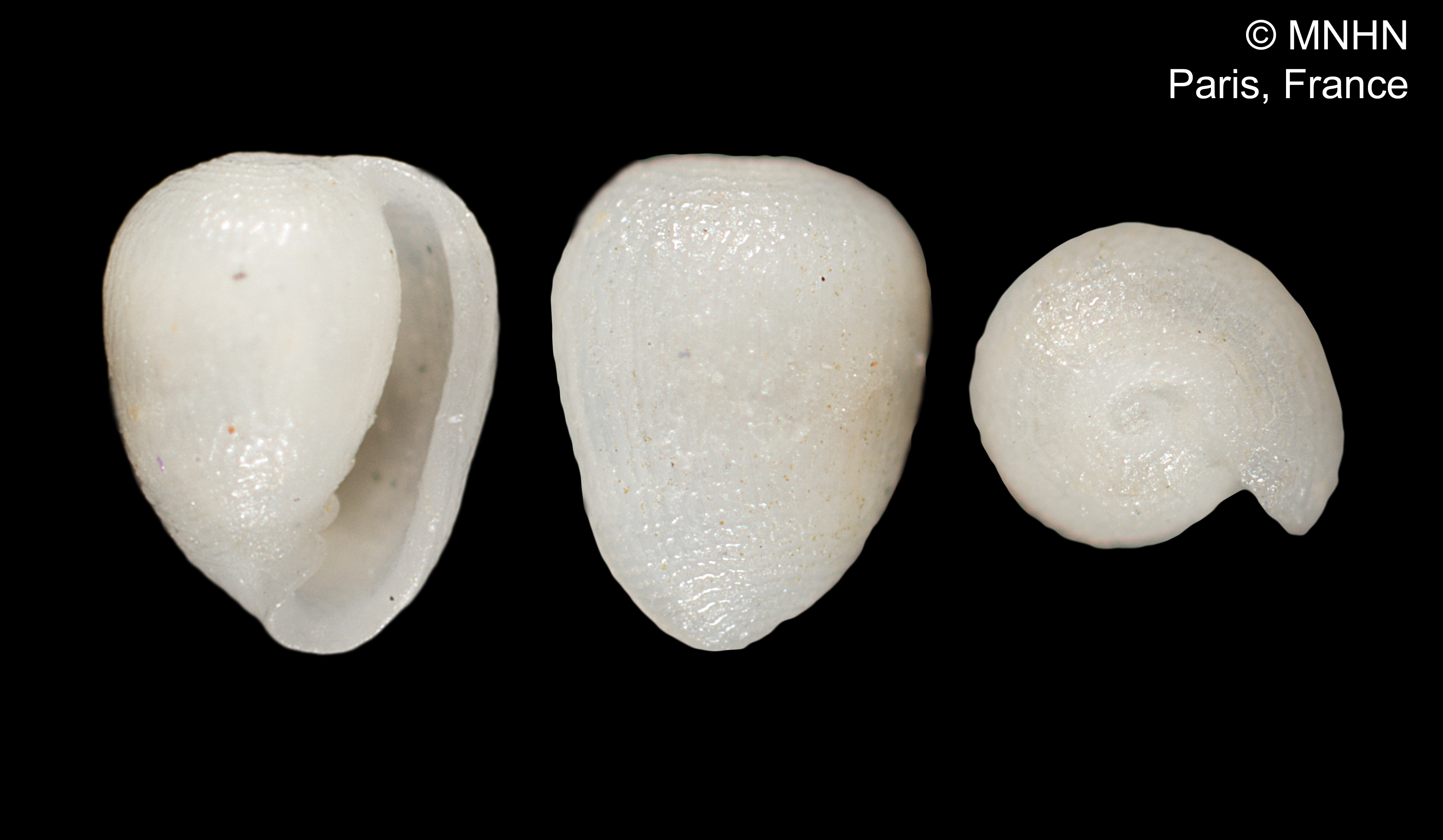
- Shell of Marginellopsis serrei (syntype at MNHN, Paris)

Scientific classification
- Kingdom: Animalia
- Phylum: Mollusca
- Class: Gastropoda
- Subclass: Caenogastropoda
- Order: Neogastropoda
- Superfamily: Volutoidea
- Family: Granulinidae
- Genus: Marginellopsis
- Species: M. serrei

Binomial name
- Marginellopsis serrei Bavay, 1911

Synonyms
- Marginellopsis marondei F. Riedel, 2000; Pugnus serrei (Bavay, 1911)

= Marginellopsis serrei =

Species of gastropod

Marginellopsis serrei is a species of very small sea snail, a marine gastropod mollusk or micromollusk in the family Granulinidae.

== Description ==
The length of the shell attains 1 mm.

== Distribution ==
This species occurs in the Caribbean Sea, the Gulf of Mexico and the Lesser Antilles.
