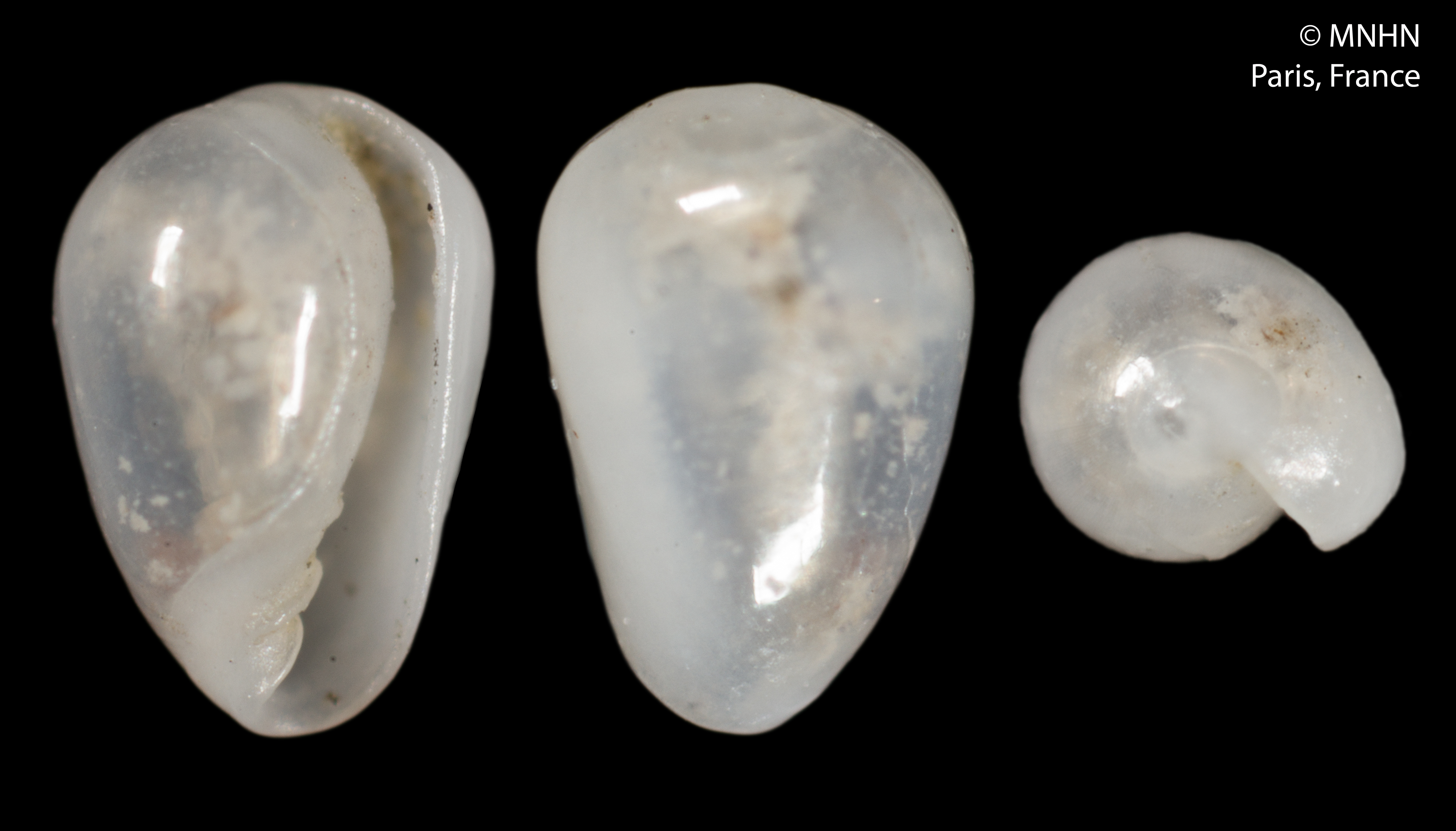
- Shell of Cystiscus bougei (lectotype at MNHN, Paris)

Scientific classification
- Kingdom: Animalia
- Phylum: Mollusca
- Class: Gastropoda
- Subclass: Caenogastropoda
- Order: Neogastropoda
- Family: Cystiscidae
- Subfamily: Cystiscinae
- Genus: Cystiscus
- Species: C. bougei

Binomial name
- Cystiscus bougei (Bavay, 1917)

Synonyms
- Granulina bougei (Bavay, 1917); Marginella bougei Bavay, 1917

= Cystiscus bougei =

Species of gastropod

Cystiscus bougei is a species of very small sea snail, a marine gastropod mollusk or micromollusk in the family Cystiscidae.

== Description ==
Cystiscus bougei is characterized by its minute size and smooth, glossy shell, typical of many species in the Cystiscidae family. The shell is usually oval to subcylindrical in shape, with a length ranging between 2 and 3 millimeters. Its small size classifies it as a micromollusk, meaning it is often not visible to the naked eye without magnification. The surface of the shell is generally smooth and polished, lacking any prominent ridges or spines that are commonly found in other types of gastropods.

The color of the shell is typically pale, ranging from off-white to light brown, with some specimens exhibiting faint translucent or glass-like qualities. These muted colors allow the snail to blend into its sandy or muddy environment, helping it avoid predation. The aperture, or shell opening, is elongate and narrow, and it runs almost the entire length of the shell, a common feature in the genus Cystiscus.

The outer lip of the aperture is thickened, but lacks teeth, making it distinct from many other gastropods that have a more complex apertural structure. Internally, the shell structure is solid, offering protection despite its small size. The interior is glossy, reflecting the external smoothness, which helps reduce friction as the soft body of the snail retracts into the shell.

Unlike many other marine snails, Cystiscus bougei does not possess an operculum, which is a hard plate used by some gastropods to seal the shell opening when retracted. The absence of an operculum in the family Cystiscidae suggests a different evolutionary adaptation for protection, where the small size and habitat selection (such as burrowing into sediment) play a primary defensive role.

Though detailed anatomical descriptions of the soft body of Cystiscus bougei are scarce, it is presumed that the species possesses a typical gastropod body plan, with a muscular foot used for locomotion and a head with tentacles for sensory perception. The foot is also used for digging into the substrate, which assists the snail in burrowing to avoid predators. Its radula, the toothed feeding organ typical of most mollusks, is adapted for carnivorous feeding, likely allowing it to consume small prey such as microorganisms and other tiny invertebrates.

Due to its small size, studying Cystiscus bougei requires specialized collecting methods. Researchers often collect specimens by sieving fine sediments from the sea floor, especially in areas like coral reefs or sandy environments where these snails thrive. Examination typically requires microscopes to accurately observe and measure the fine details of the shell structure.

The delicate morphology of Cystiscus bougei underscores its adaptability to specific marine habitats. Its small, streamlined shell minimizes resistance when moving through sand or silt, and its smooth, glossy surface prevents particles from sticking to it. This micro-adaptation likely plays a role in its survival in dynamic, shallow-water environments where currents can shift fine sediments.

== Distribution ==
Cystiscus bougei typically inhabits Indo-Pacific waters, particularly around French Polynesia. This species is found in shallow to moderately deep waters, usually on soft substrates of sand or mud. Due to its small size and specialized habitat, it often goes unnoticed by the unaided eye, though it plays a significant role in marine ecosystems.
