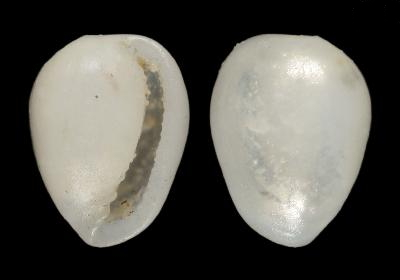
- Shell of Granulina isseli (syntype at MNHN, Paris)

Scientific classification
- Kingdom: Animalia
- Phylum: Mollusca
- Class: Gastropoda
- Subclass: Caenogastropoda
- Order: Neogastropoda
- Superfamily: Volutoidea
- Family: Granulinidae; G. A. Coovert & H. K. Coovert, 1995

Genera
- See text

Synonyms
- Granulininae G. A. Coovert & H. K. Coovert, 1995 (original rank)

= Granulinidae =

Family of sea snails

Granulinidae are a family of small to medium-large sea snails, marine gastropod mollusks in the clade Neogastropoda.

== Genera ==
In 2019 the subfamily Granulininae has been raised to rank of family Granulinidae G. A. Coovert & H. K. Coovert, 1995 (original rank).

This subfamily was originally placed in family Cystiscidae by Coovert & Coovert (1995) but placed back in Marginellidae, following La Perna (1999) and based on the morphology of living animals.

- Granulina Jousseaume, 1888
- Granulinella Boyer, 2017
- Granulinopsis Boyer, 2017
- Hiwia Marwick, 1931 †
- Marginellopsis Bavay, 1911
- Paolaura Smriglio & Mariottini, 2001
- Pugnus Hedley, 1896

Gnera brought into synonymy

- Cypraeolina Cerulli-Irelli, 1911: synonym of Granulina Jousseaume, 1888
- Merovia Dall, 1921: synonym of Granulina Jousseaume, 1888
- Microginella Laseron, 1957: synonym of Granulina Jousseaume, 1888
