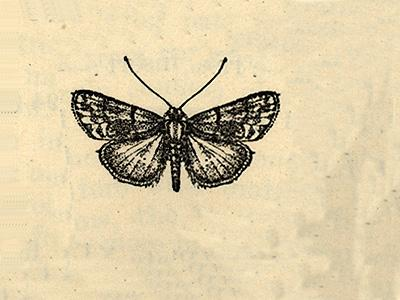
- Palpidia melanotricha
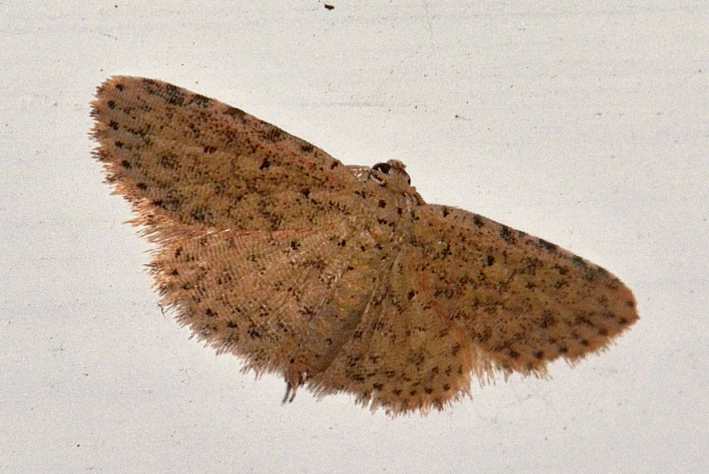
- Sigela basipunctaria

Scientific classification
- Kingdom: Animalia
- Phylum: Arthropoda
- Class: Insecta
- Order: Lepidoptera
- Superfamily: Noctuoidea
- Family: Erebidae
- Subfamily: Scolecocampinae; Grote, 1883

= Scolecocampinae =

Subfamily of moths

The Scolecocampinae are a subfamily of moths in the family Erebidae. The taxon was erected by Augustus Radcliffe Grote in 1883.

== Taxonomy ==
Moths in the subfamily typically have an enclosed, sac-like tympanal pocket, split genital claspers with "costa extended dorsoapically into a long, free process," and a slender sacculus.

Phylogenetic analysis supports the subfamily as a clade within Erebidae, but its contents are a topic of further study.

== Genera ==
- Abablemma
- Arugisa
- Gabara
- Nigetia
- Palpidia
- Pharga
- Phobolosia
- Pseudorgyia
- Scolecocampa Guenée, 1852
- Sigela Hulst, 1896
