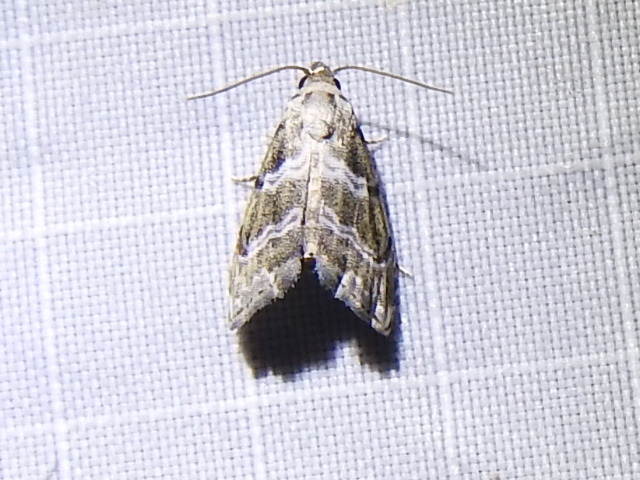
- Abablemma bilineata

Scientific classification
- Domain: Eukaryota
- Kingdom: Animalia
- Phylum: Arthropoda
- Class: Insecta
- Order: Lepidoptera
- Superfamily: Noctuoidea
- Family: Erebidae
- Subfamily: Scolecocampinae
- Genus: Abablemma; Nye, 1975

Type species
- Microblemma discipuncta Hampson, 1910

= Abablemma =

Genus of moths

Abablemma is a genus of moths in the family Erebidae. The genus was described by Nye in 1910.

== Taxonomy ==
The genus was previously classified in the subfamily Acontiinae of the family Noctuidae.

== Species ==
In alphabetical order:

- Abablemma bilineata (Barnes & McDunnough, 1916) Texas
- Abablemma brimleyana (Dyar, 1914) North Carolina
- Abablemma discipuncta (Hampson, 1910) Panama
- Abablemma duomaculata (Barnes & Benjamin, 1925)
- Abablemma grandimacula (Schaus, 1911) Costa Rica
- Abablemma ulopus (Dyar, 1914) Panama
