= Gabara =

Gabara may refer to:

- Gabara (Godzilla), a giant monster, or kaiju in the Godzilla franchise
- Gabara, a village in antiquity associated with Arraba, Israel
- Gabara, Palestine (also known as Gadara), an ancient city in the Roman Decapolis region of Palestine
- Gabara (moth), a genus of moths of the family Erebidae
- Gabara, an Arabian giant, according to Pliny the Elder
