= Gabara obscura =

Scientific classification
- Kingdom: Animalia
- Phylum: Arthropoda
- Clade: Pancrustacea
- Class: Insecta
- Order: Lepidoptera
- Superfamily: Noctuoidea
- Family: Erebidae
- Genus: Gabara
- Species: G. obscura

Binomial name
- Gabara obscura (Grote, 1883)

Species of moth

Gabara obscura is a species of moth in the family Erebidae. It is found in North America.
