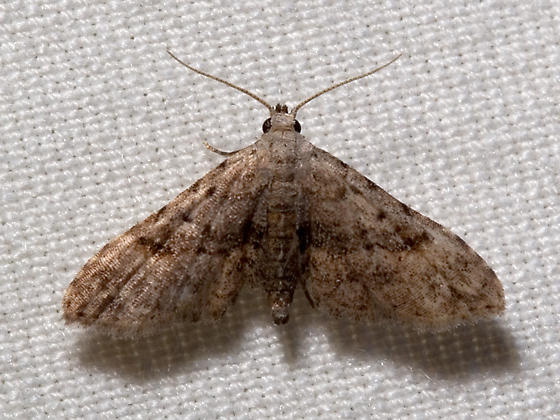

Scientific classification
- Domain: Eukaryota
- Kingdom: Animalia
- Phylum: Arthropoda
- Class: Insecta
- Order: Lepidoptera
- Superfamily: Noctuoidea
- Family: Erebidae
- Genus: Sigela
- Species: S. penumbrata

Binomial name
- Sigela penumbrata Hulst, 1896

= Sigela penumbrata =

Species of moth

Sigela penumbrata, the stippled sigela moth, is a species of moth in the family Erebidae. The species is found in North America, including Tennessee and Florida. The wingspan is about 11 mm.
