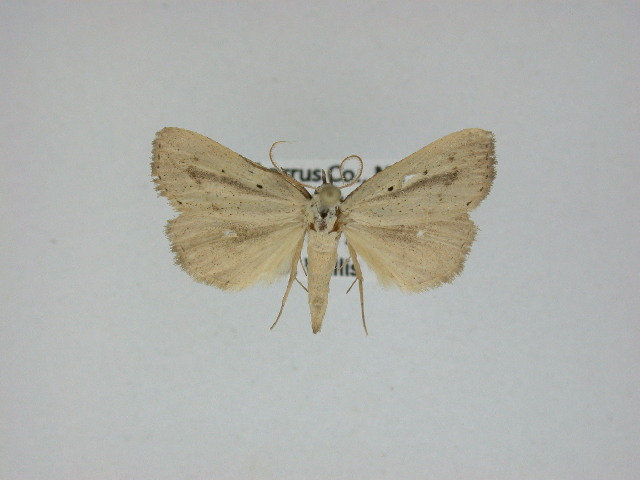

Scientific classification
- Kingdom: Animalia
- Phylum: Arthropoda
- Clade: Pancrustacea
- Class: Insecta
- Order: Lepidoptera
- Superfamily: Noctuoidea
- Family: Erebidae
- Genus: Gabara
- Species: G. distema

Binomial name
- Gabara distema (Grote, 1880)

Synonyms
- Gabara strigata (J. B. Smith, 1902); Gabara depunctata (Strand, 1916); Gabara umbonata (J. B. Smith, 1903); Gabara apicalis (J. B. Smith, 1903); Gabara distema humeralis

= Gabara distema =

Species of moth

Gabara distema is a species of moth in the family Erebidae. The species is endemic to North America, specifically the states of Texas, Arizona, North Carolina and Florida.

The larvae probably feed on wiregrass.
