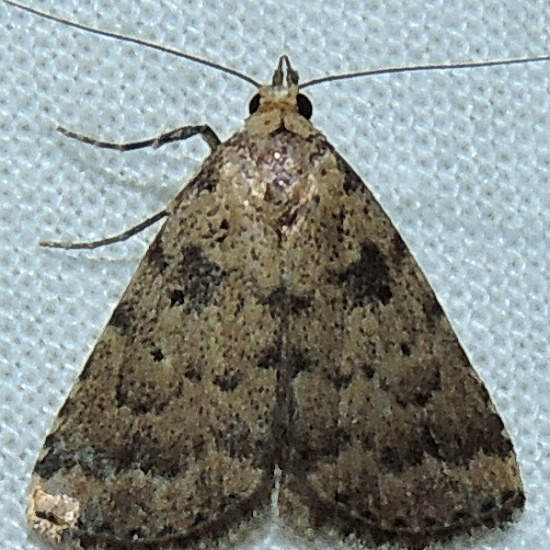

Scientific classification
- Kingdom: Animalia
- Phylum: Arthropoda
- Class: Insecta
- Order: Lepidoptera
- Superfamily: Noctuoidea
- Family: Erebidae
- Genus: Arugisa
- Species: A. latiorella

Binomial name
- Arugisa latiorella (Walker, 1863)

Synonyms
- Acrobasis latiorella Walker, 1863; Arugisa watsoni Richards, 1941

= Arugisa latiorella =

Species of moth

Arugisa latiorella, or Watson's arugisa moth, is a moth in the family Erebidae. The species was first described by Francis Walker in 1863. The species is found in North America, where it has been recorded from Florida to Texas, north to Kansas and Maryland.

The wingspan is 18–22 mm. Adults are on wing from January to November.

The larvae feed on both living and dead Poa pratensis.
