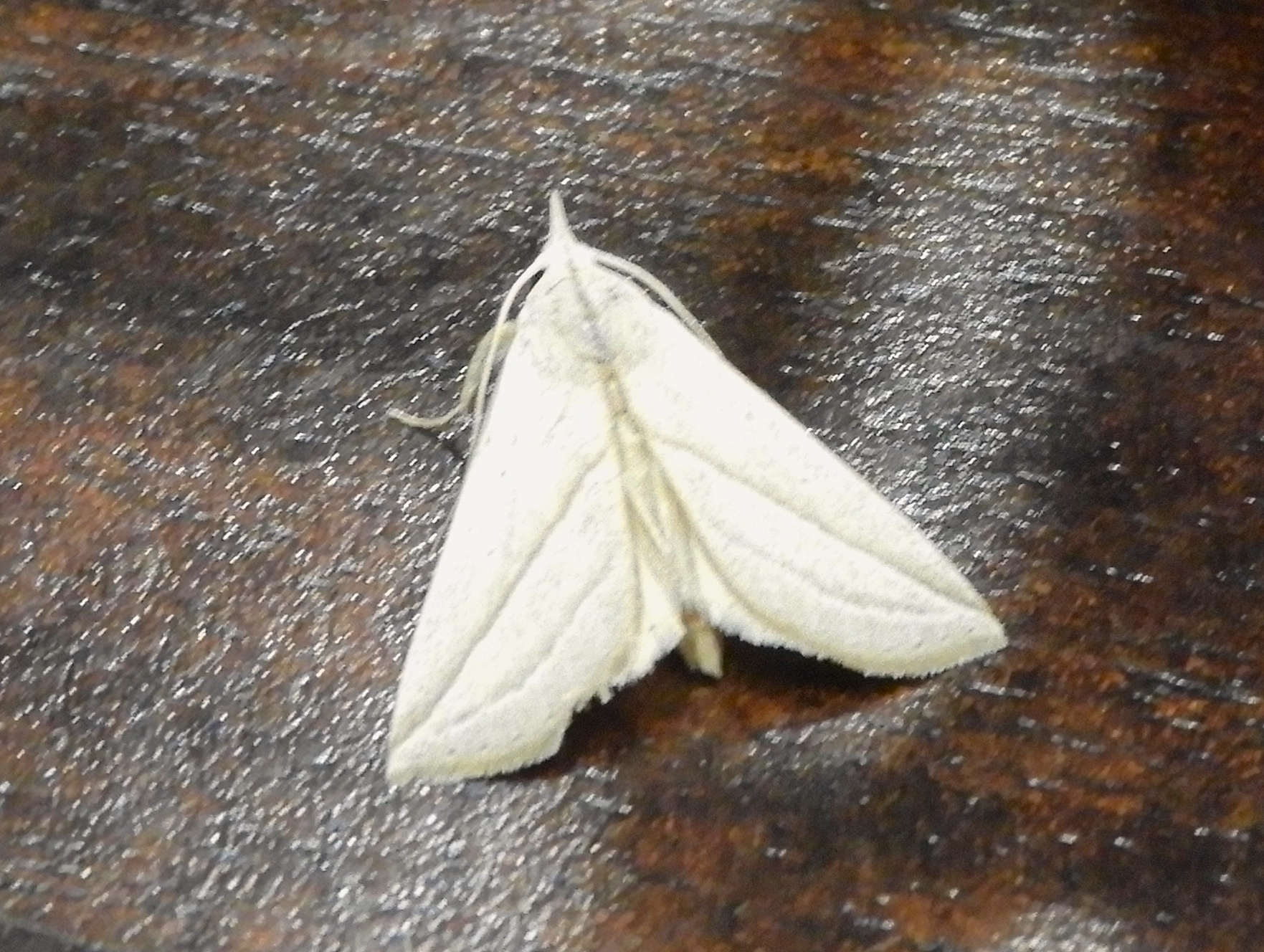
- Pharga pholausalis

Scientific classification
- Kingdom: Animalia
- Phylum: Arthropoda
- Class: Insecta
- Order: Lepidoptera
- Superfamily: Noctuoidea
- Family: Erebidae
- Subfamily: Scolecocampinae
- Genus: Pharga; Walker, 1863

= Pharga =

Genus of moths

Pharga is a genus of moths in the family Erebidae. The genus was erected by Francis Walker in 1863.

== Taxonomy ==
The genus was previously classified in the subfamily Calpinae of the family Noctuidae.

== Species ==
- Pharga barbara Schaus, 1915 Rio de Janeiro in Brazil
- Pharga pallens (Barnes & McDunnough, 1911) Arizona in the US
- Pharga pholausalis (Walker, [1859]) Venezuela
