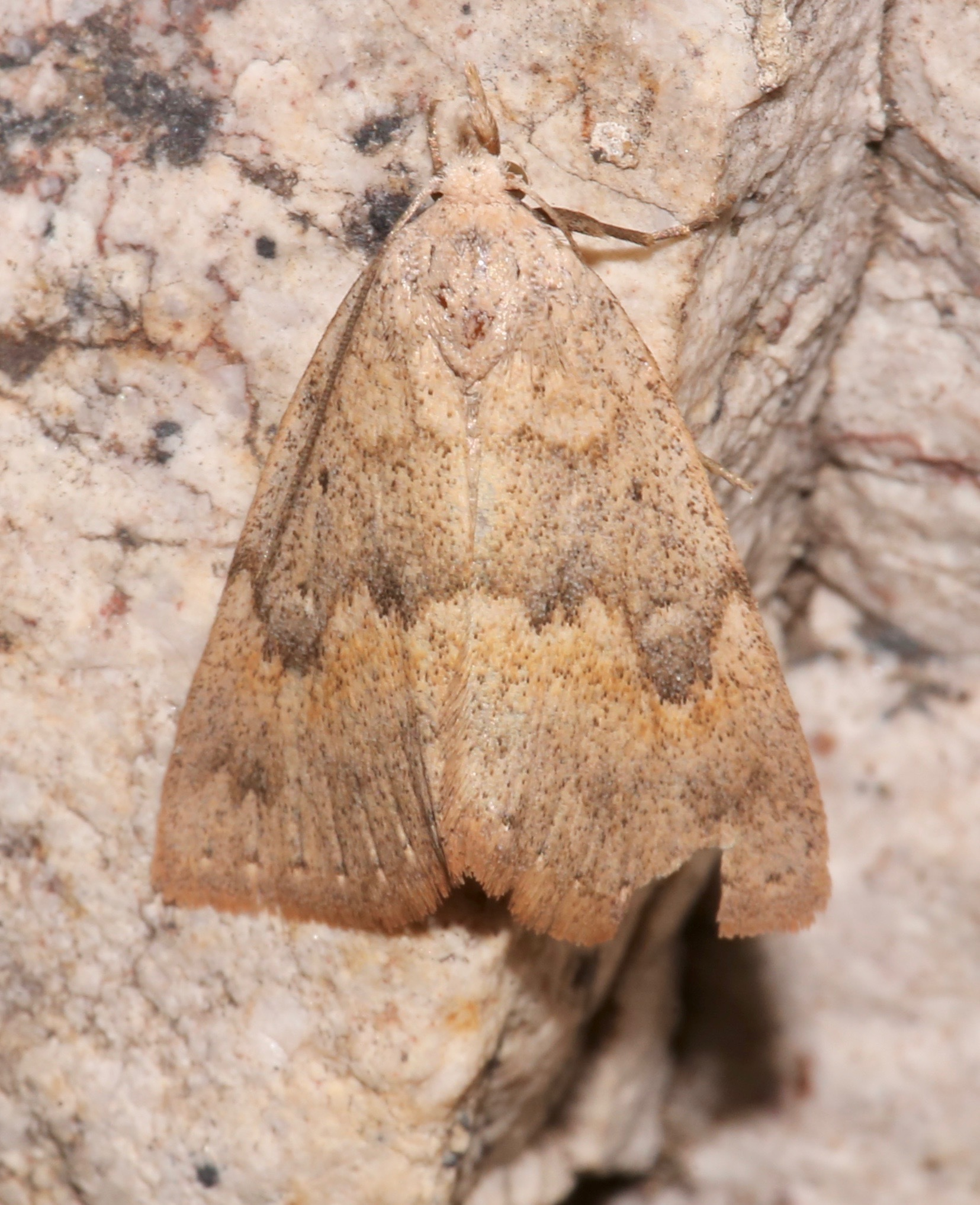
- Pseudorgyia russula

Scientific classification
- Domain: Eukaryota
- Kingdom: Animalia
- Phylum: Arthropoda
- Class: Insecta
- Order: Lepidoptera
- Superfamily: Noctuoidea
- Family: Erebidae
- Subfamily: Scolecocampinae
- Genus: Pseudorgyia; Harvey, 1875

Synonyms
- Aretypa Smith, 1903

= Pseudorgyia =

Genus of moths

Pseudorgyia is a genus of moths in the family Erebidae. The genus was erected by Leon F. Harvey in 1875.

== Taxonomy ==
The genus was previously classified in the subfamily Calpinae of the family Noctuidae.

== Species ==
- Pseudorgyia russula Grote, 1883
- Pseudorgyia versuta Harvey, 1875
