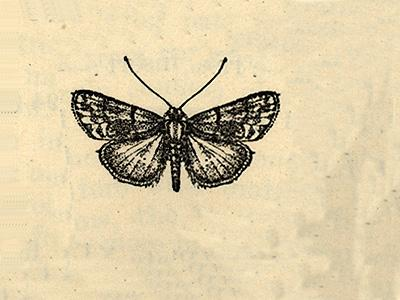
- Palpidia melanotricha

Scientific classification
- Kingdom: Animalia
- Phylum: Arthropoda
- Class: Insecta
- Order: Lepidoptera
- Superfamily: Noctuoidea
- Family: Erebidae
- Subfamily: Scolecocampinae
- Genus: Palpidia; Dyar, 1898

Synonyms
- Echinocampa Franclemont, 1949

= Palpidia =

Genus of moths

Palpidia is a genus of moths in the family Erebidae. The genus was erected by Harrison Gray Dyar Jr. in 1898.

== Taxonomy ==
The genus was previously classified in the subfamily Calpinae of the family Noctuidae.

== Species ==
- Palpidia cocophaga (Franclemont, 1949) Cuba
- Palpidia melanotricha Hampson, 1907 Jamaica
- Palpidia pallidior Dyar, 1898 Florida
