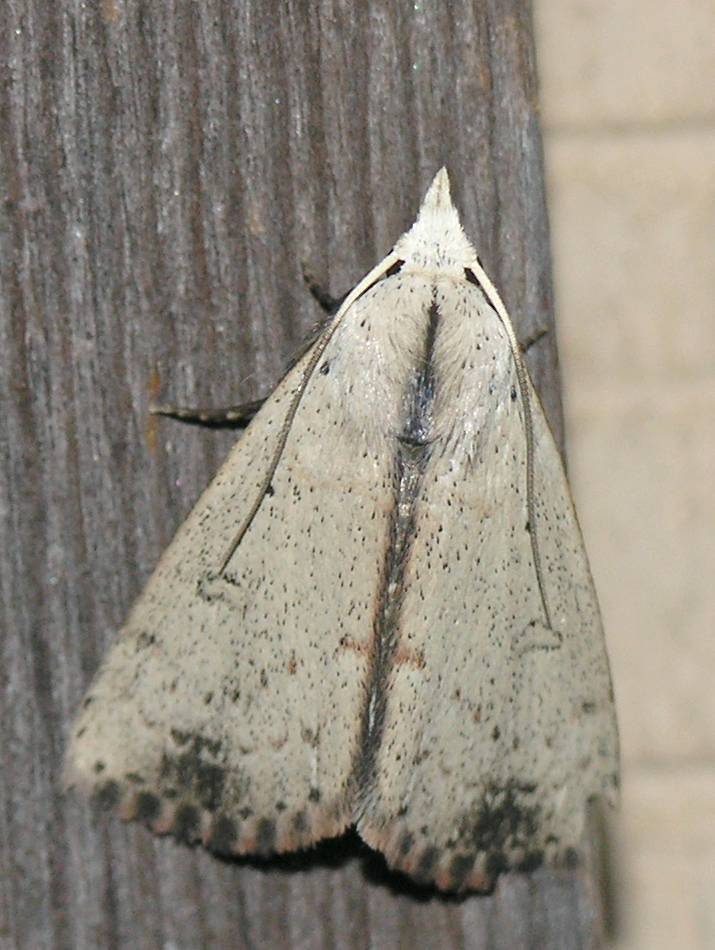
- Scolecocampa liburna

Scientific classification
- Kingdom: Animalia
- Phylum: Arthropoda
- Class: Insecta
- Order: Lepidoptera
- Superfamily: Noctuoidea
- Family: Erebidae
- Subfamily: Scolecocampinae
- Genus: Scolecocampa; Guenée, 1852

Synonyms
- Chadaca Walker, 1858; Herminodes Guenée, 1852; Rhosologia Walker, 1865

= Scolecocampa =

Genus of moths

Scolecocampa is a genus of moths in the family Erebidae. The genus was erected by Achille Guenée in 1852.

== Taxonomy ==
The genus was previously classified in the subfamily Calpinae of the family Noctuidae.

== Species ==
- Scolecocampa atriluna J. B. Smith, 1903
- Scolecocampa atrosignata Walker, 1858
- Scolecocampa liburna Geyer, 1837
- Scolecocampa pilosa Schaus, 1914
- Scolecocampa porrecta Walker, 1865
- Scolecocampa tessellata Hampson, 1926
- Scolecocampa tripuncta Schaus, 1901
