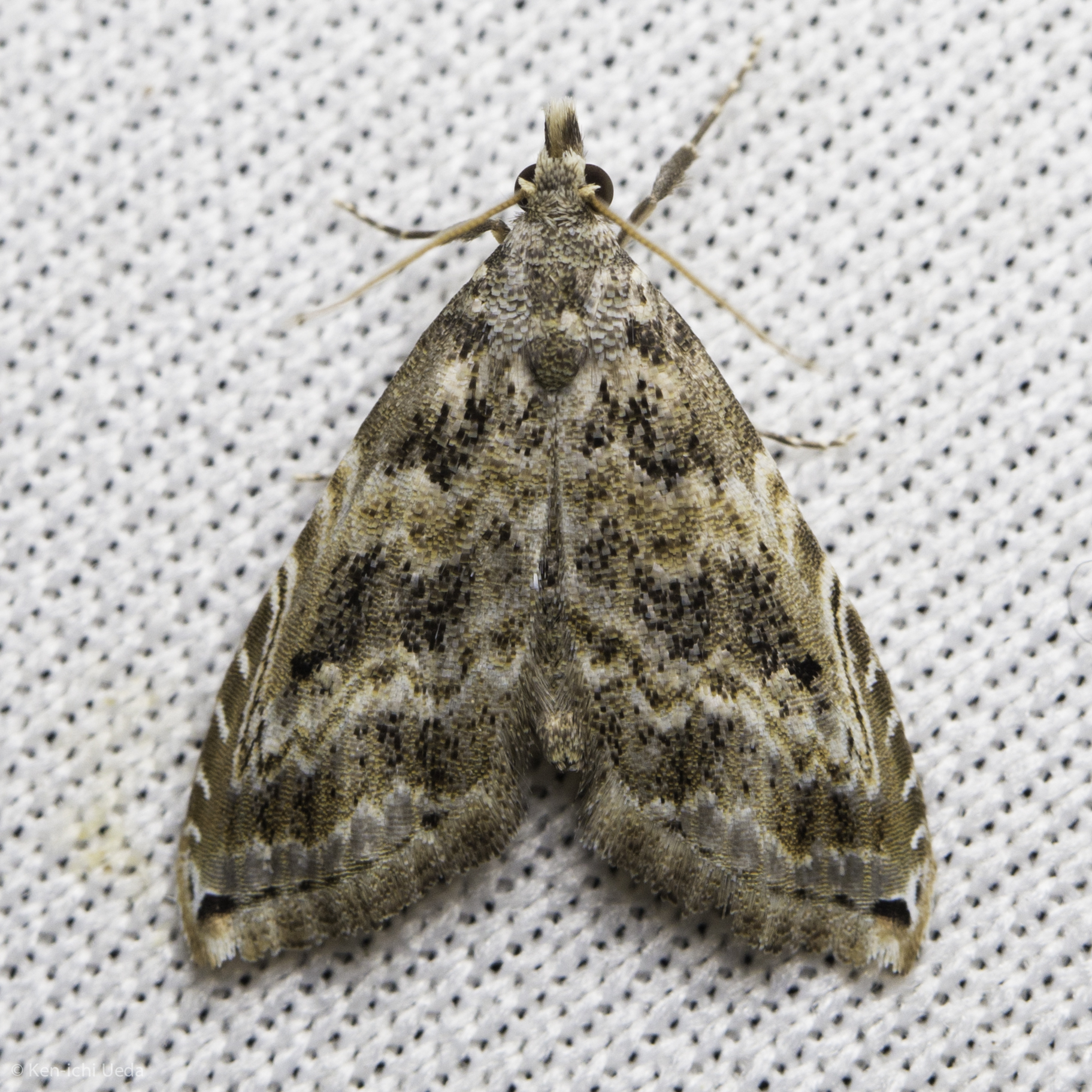

Scientific classification
- Domain: Eukaryota
- Kingdom: Animalia
- Phylum: Arthropoda
- Class: Insecta
- Order: Lepidoptera
- Superfamily: Noctuoidea
- Family: Erebidae
- Genus: Phobolosia
- Species: P. anfracta

Binomial name
- Phobolosia anfracta (H. Edwards, 1881)

= Phobolosia anfracta =

Species of moth

Phobolosia anfracta is a species of moth in the family Erebidae first described by Henry Edwards in 1881. It is found in North America.

The MONA or Hodges number for Phobolosia anfracta is 8439.
