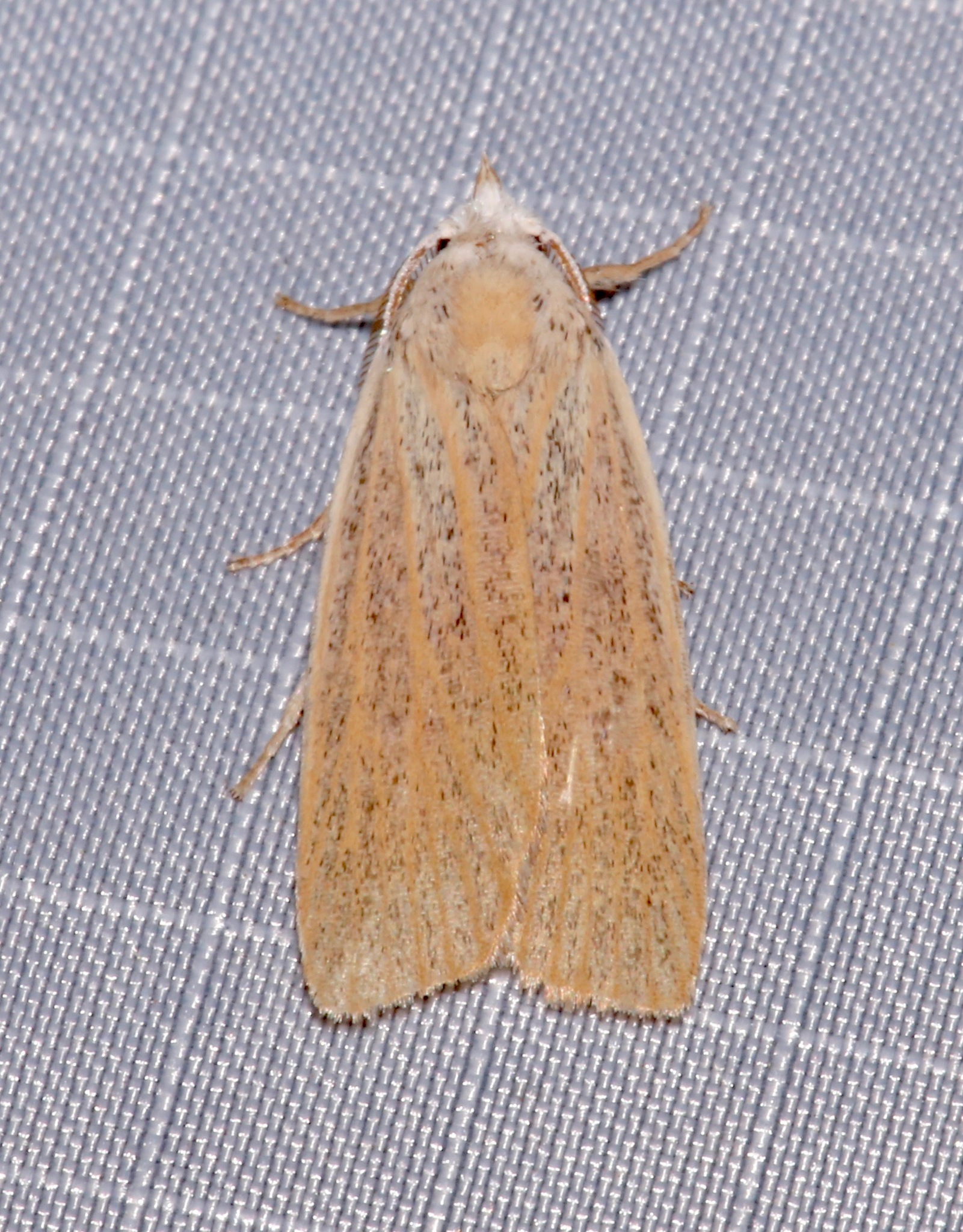

Scientific classification
- Kingdom: Animalia
- Phylum: Arthropoda
- Class: Insecta
- Order: Lepidoptera
- Superfamily: Noctuoidea
- Family: Erebidae
- Genus: Palpidia
- Species: P. pallidior

Binomial name
- Palpidia pallidior Dyar, 1898

Synonyms
- Echinocampa cocophaga Franclemont, 1949

= Palpidia pallidior =

Species of moth

Palpidia pallidior is a species of moth in the family Erebidae.

== Distribution ==
This species is found in Florida and Cuba.

== Description ==
This moth has mottled brown forewings and white hind wings that are hidden when the moth is at rest. The body is stout and the wingspan is about 35 mm.

== Biology ==
The adult moths are probably nocturnal as are most noctuoids. The larvae are probably foliage eaters but are not known as an agricultural pest.
