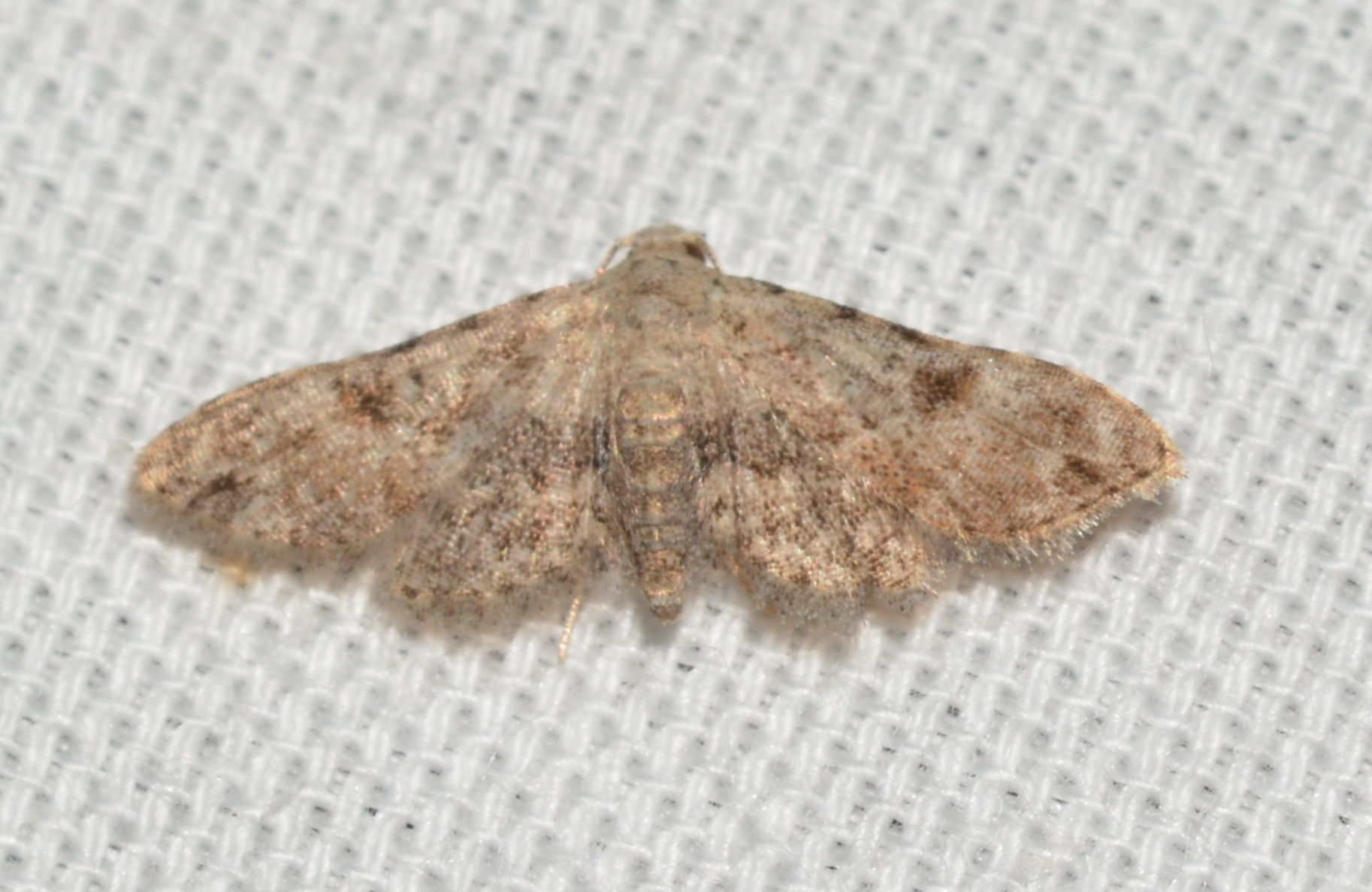

Scientific classification
- Kingdom: Animalia
- Phylum: Arthropoda
- Clade: Pancrustacea
- Class: Insecta
- Order: Lepidoptera
- Superfamily: Noctuoidea
- Family: Erebidae
- Genus: Sigela
- Species: S. brauneata

Binomial name
- Sigela brauneata (Swett, 1913)

= Sigela brauneata =

Species of moth

Sigela brauneata is a species of moth in the family Erebidae first described by Louis W. Swett in 1913. It is found in North America.
