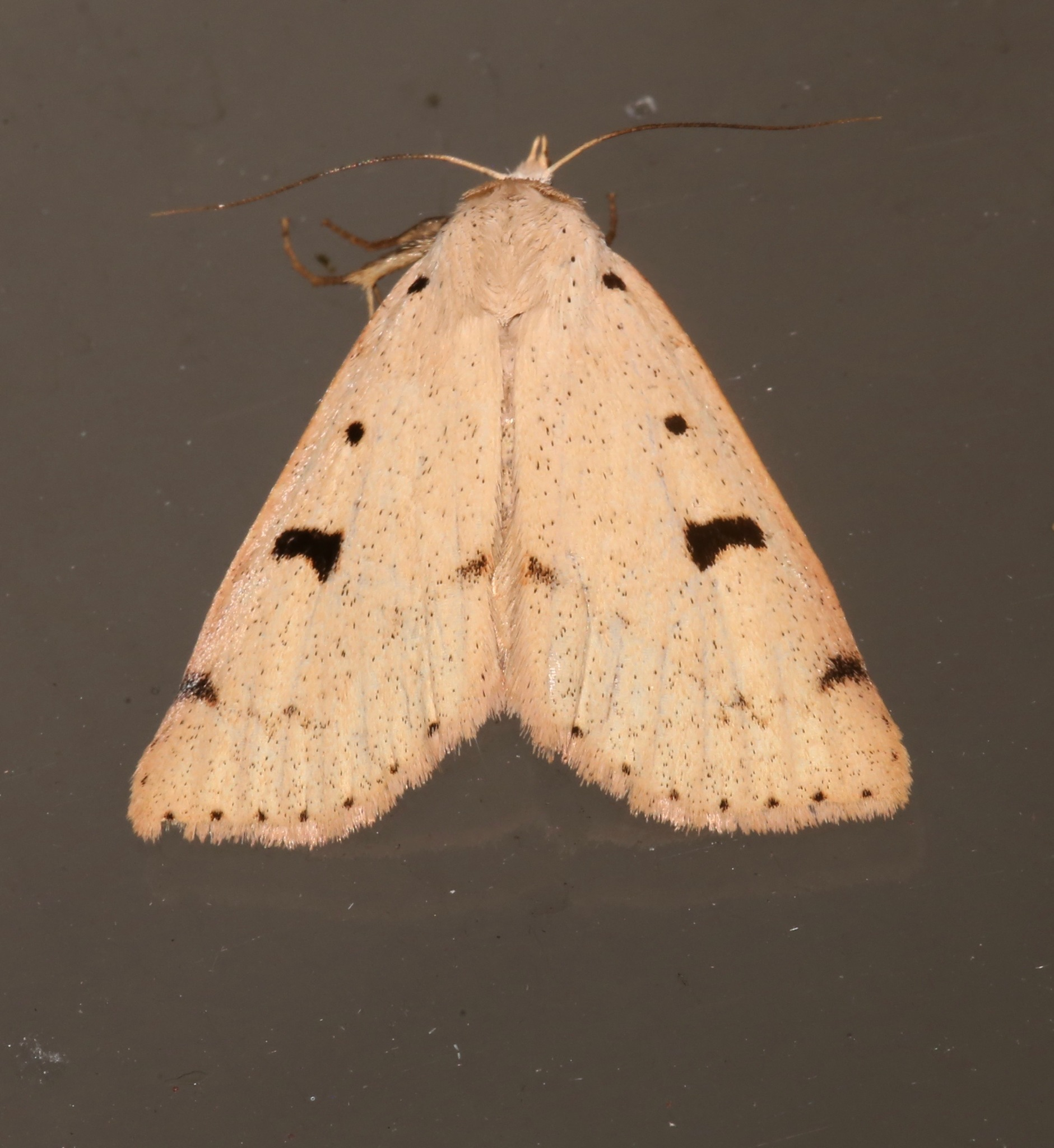

Scientific classification
- Kingdom: Animalia
- Phylum: Arthropoda
- Clade: Pancrustacea
- Class: Insecta
- Order: Lepidoptera
- Superfamily: Noctuoidea
- Family: Erebidae
- Genus: Scolecocampa
- Species: S. atriluna

Binomial name
- Scolecocampa atriluna Smith, 1903

= Scolecocampa atriluna =

Species of moth

Scolecocampa atriluna is a species of moth in the family Erebidae. It is found in North America.

The MONA or Hodges number for Scolecocampa atriluna is 8515.
