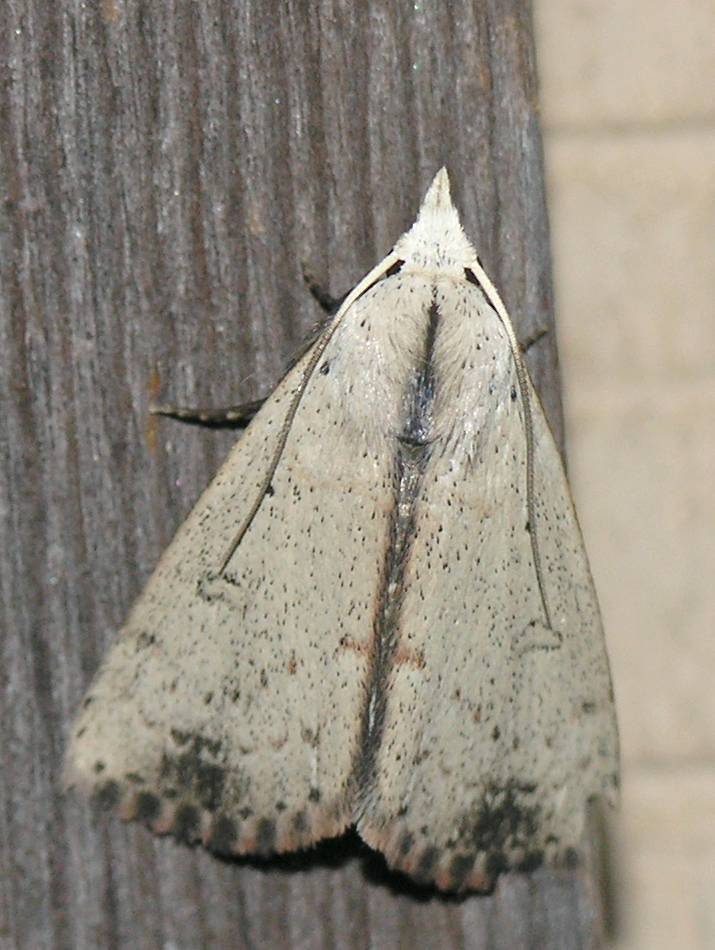

Scientific classification
- Domain: Eukaryota
- Kingdom: Animalia
- Phylum: Arthropoda
- Class: Insecta
- Order: Lepidoptera
- Superfamily: Noctuoidea
- Family: Erebidae
- Genus: Scolecocampa
- Species: S. liburna

Binomial name
- Scolecocampa liburna (Geyer, 1837)

Synonyms
- Scolecocampa ligni Guenée, 1852

= Scolecocampa liburna =

Species of moth

Scolecocampa liburna, the dead-wood borer, is a moth in the family Erebidae. The species was first described by Carl Geyer in 1837. It is found in the US from southern Wisconsin and Michigan to central New England south to Florida and Texas.

The wingspan is 35–43 mm. Adults are on wing from late May to late July and again in late August in southern Ohio. There seems to be one generation in the north. There are more generations southward.

The larvae tunnel in fallen branches and trunks of chestnut, hickory, oak, sycamore and other trees. Larvae have also been recorded from fallen dead tulip trees.
