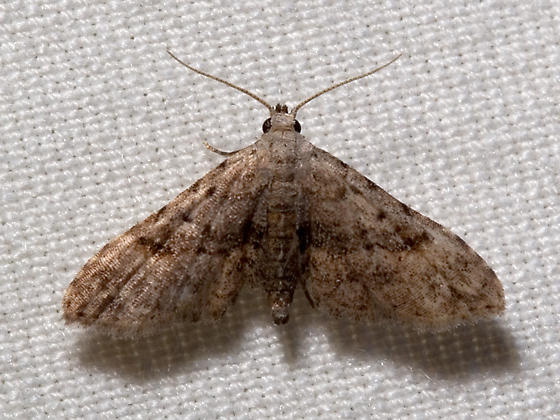
- Sigela penumbrata

Scientific classification
- Kingdom: Animalia
- Phylum: Arthropoda
- Class: Insecta
- Order: Lepidoptera
- Superfamily: Noctuoidea
- Family: Erebidae
- Subfamily: Scolecocampinae
- Genus: Sigela; Hulst, 1896

= Sigela =

Genus of moths

Sigela is a genus of moths in the family Erebidae. The genus was erected by George Duryea Hulst in 1896.

== Taxonomy ==
The genus was previously classified in the subfamily Acontiinae of the family Noctuidae.

== Species ==
- Sigela basipunctaria Walker, 1861 (from Florida)
- Sigela brauneata (Swett, 1913) (formerly Quandara brauneata - from North America)
- Sigela eoides Barnes & McDunnough, 1913 (misspelling Sigela coides)
- Sigela holopolia Dyar, 1914 (from Panama)
- Sigela incisa Troubridge, 2020 (from Florida)
- Sigela leucozona Hampson, 1910 (Central & South America)
- Sigela lynx Troubridge, 2020 (from Florida)
- Sigela mathetes Dyar, 1914 (from Panama)
- Sigela minuta Troubridge, 2020 (from Florida)
- Sigela ormensis Schaus, 1914 (from French Guyana)
- Sigela penumbrata Hulst, 1896 (North America)
- Sigela rosea Troubridge, 2020 (from Florida)
- Sigela sodis Dyar, 1914 (from Panama)
- Sigela sordes Troubridge, 2020 (from Florida)
- Sigela subincisa Troubridge, 2020 (from Florida)
- Sigela vilhelmina (Dyar, 1916) (from Mexico)
