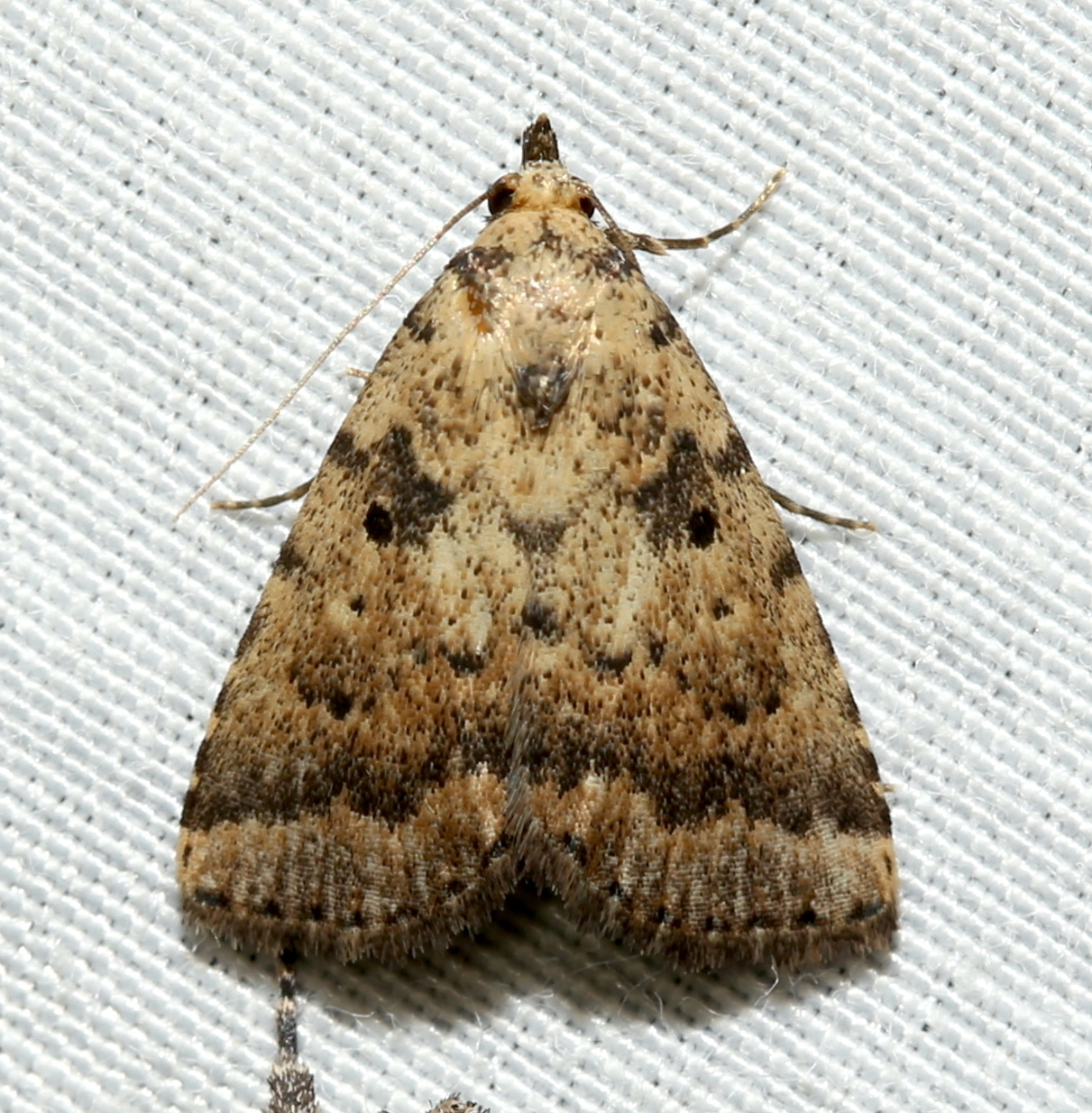

Scientific classification
- Kingdom: Animalia
- Phylum: Arthropoda
- Class: Insecta
- Order: Lepidoptera
- Superfamily: Noctuoidea
- Family: Erebidae
- Genus: Arugisa
- Species: A. lutea

Binomial name
- Arugisa lutea (J. B. Smith, 1900)

Synonyms
- Diallagma lutea Smith, 1900; Arugisa latiorella of Covell et al., 2005 (not Walker, 1863)

= Arugisa lutea =

Species of moth

Arugisa lutea, the common arugisa moth, is a species of moth in the family Erebidae. The species was first described by John B. Smith in 1900. It is found in the United States, where it has been recorded from Maryland and Virginia to Florida, west to Texas and Missouri.

The wingspan is about 17 mm. Adults are mostly on wing from May to October, but have been recorded on wing nearly year round in Florida.

The larvae feed on both living and dead grasses. They have also been recorded feeding on blue-green algae.
