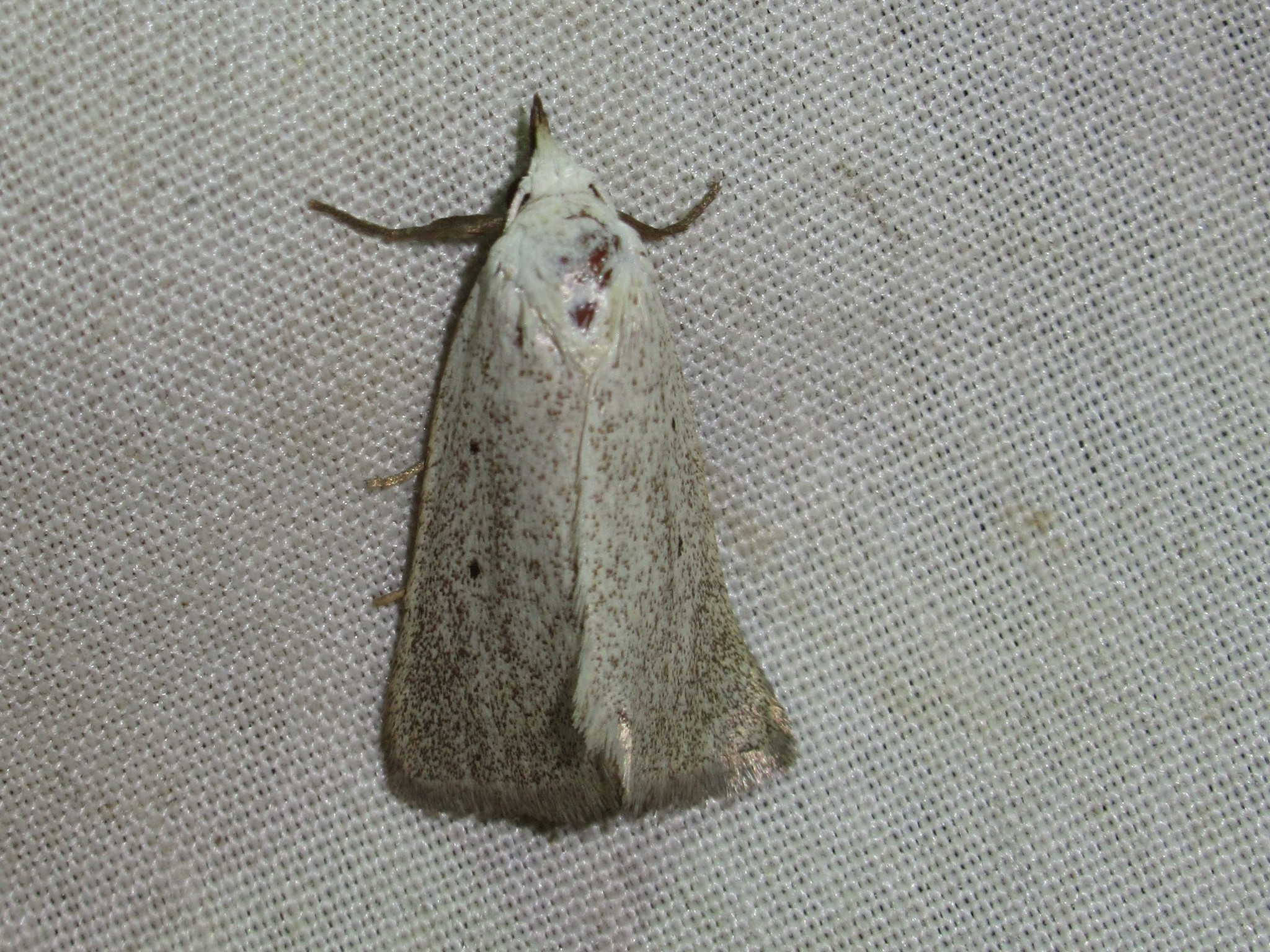

Scientific classification
- Kingdom: Animalia
- Phylum: Arthropoda
- Class: Insecta
- Order: Lepidoptera
- Superfamily: Noctuoidea
- Family: Erebidae
- Genus: Gabara
- Species: G. subnivosella

Binomial name
- Gabara subnivosella Walker, 1866

Synonyms
- Gabara nivealis (J. B. Smith, 1903); Gabara subnivosella bipuncta

= Gabara subnivosella =

Species of moth

Gabara subnivosella, the wet sand savannah moth, is a moth in the family Erebidae. The species was first described by Francis Walker in 1866. It is found in North America from Manitoba south to Maryland, Massachusetts and New York. The wingspan is about 25 mm.
