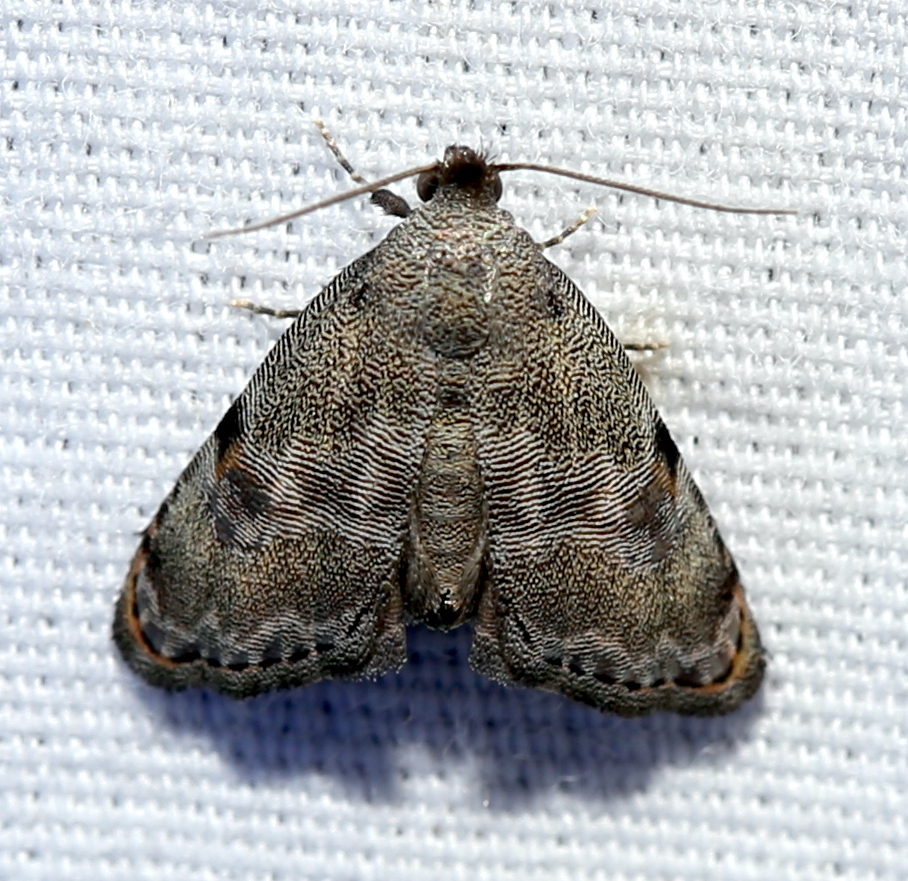

Scientific classification
- Kingdom: Animalia
- Phylum: Arthropoda
- Class: Insecta
- Order: Lepidoptera
- Superfamily: Noctuoidea
- Family: Erebidae
- Genus: Abablemma
- Species: A. brimleyana

Binomial name
- Abablemma brimleyana (Dyar, 1914)

Synonyms
- Phobolosia brimleyana Dyar, 1914

= Abablemma brimleyana =

Brimley's algibelle

Species of moth

Abablemma brimleyana, or Brimley's algibelle, is a species of moth in the family Erebidae. It was originally described as Phobolosia brimleyana by Harrison Gray Dyar Jr. in 1914. The genus is found in the United States from New Jersey south to Florida and Texas.

The wingspan is about 15 mm. The main flight period appears to be April to October. John B. Heppner reported adults on wing from January to July and again from September to December in Florida. There are two generations in the north, more in the southern parts of its range.

Larvae have been reared on Protococcus species, but probably also feed on lichens.
