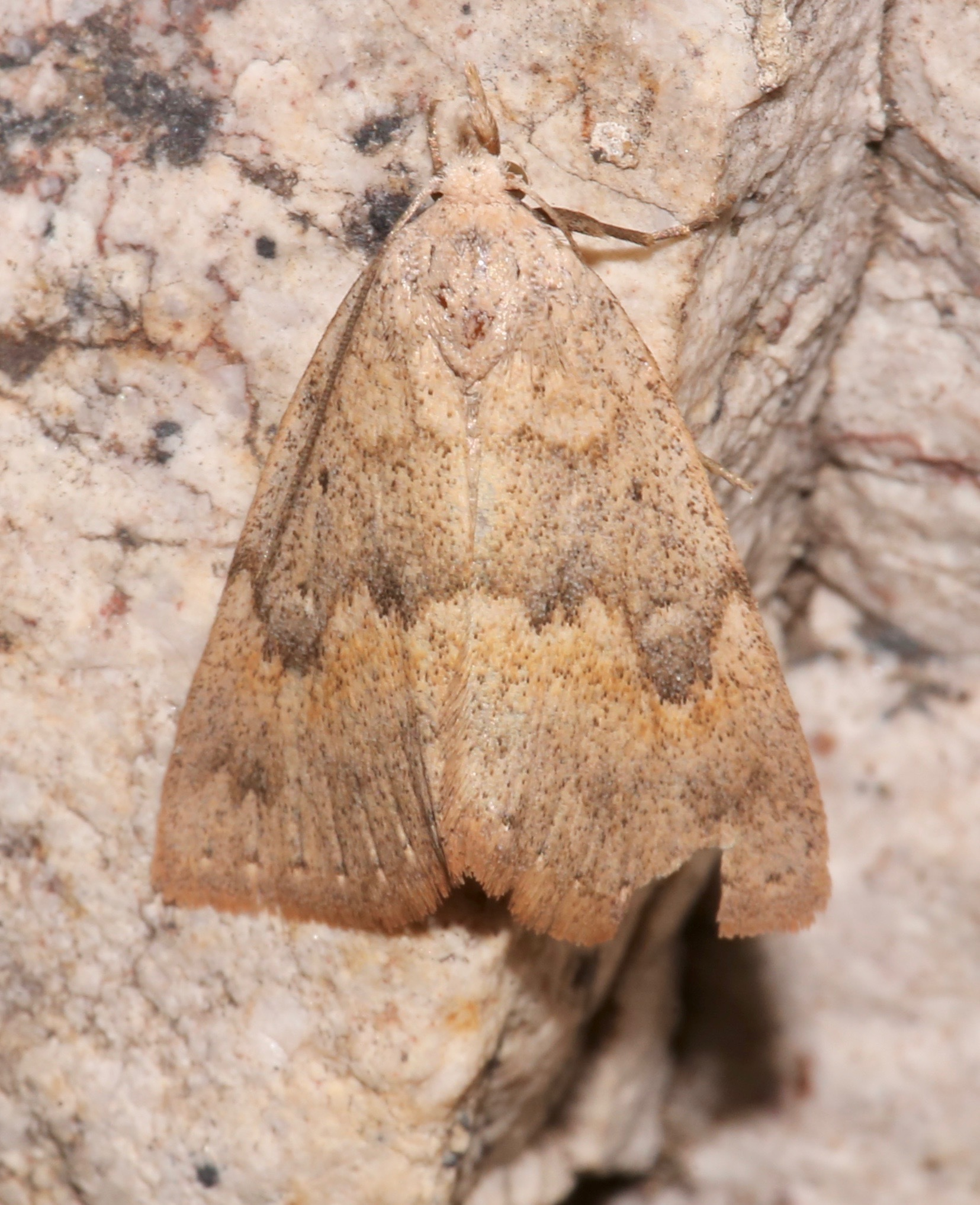

Scientific classification
- Domain: Eukaryota
- Kingdom: Animalia
- Phylum: Arthropoda
- Class: Insecta
- Order: Lepidoptera
- Superfamily: Noctuoidea
- Family: Erebidae
- Genus: Pseudorgyia
- Species: P. russula

Binomial name
- Pseudorgyia russula Grote, 1883

= Pseudorgyia russula =

Species of moth

Pseudorgyia russula is a species of moth in the family Erebidae. It is found in North America.

The MONA or Hodges number for Pseudorgyia russula is 8513.
