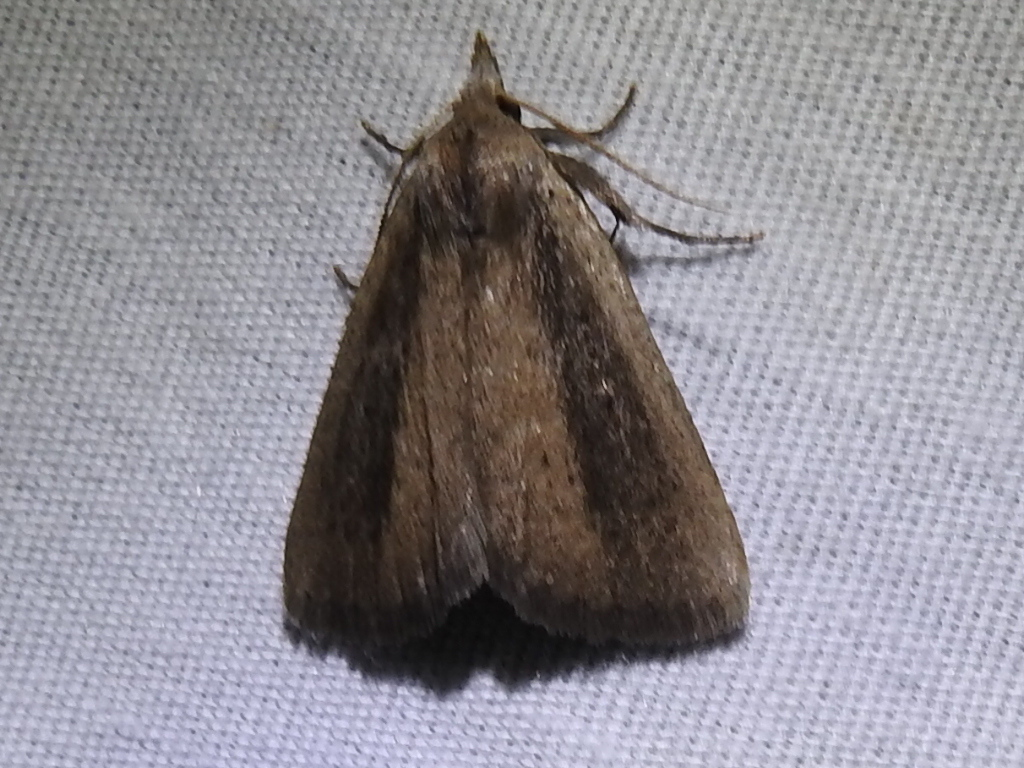

Scientific classification
- Kingdom: Animalia
- Phylum: Arthropoda
- Clade: Pancrustacea
- Class: Insecta
- Order: Lepidoptera
- Superfamily: Noctuoidea
- Family: Erebidae
- Genus: Gabara
- Species: G. stygialis

Binomial name
- Gabara stygialis (Smith, 1903)

Synonyms
- Gabara infumata (Hampson, 1926)

= Gabara stygialis =

Species of moth

Gabara stygialis is a species of moth in the family Erebidae. It is found in North America.
