= Pharga pallens =

Scientific classification
- Domain: Eukaryota
- Kingdom: Animalia
- Phylum: Arthropoda
- Class: Insecta
- Order: Lepidoptera
- Superfamily: Noctuoidea
- Family: Erebidae
- Genus: Pharga
- Species: P. pallens

Binomial name
- Pharga pallens (Barnes & McDunnough, 1911)

Species of moth

Pharga pallens is a species of moth in the family Erebidae. It was first described by William Barnes and James Halliday McDunnough in 1911 and it is found in North America.

The MONA or Hodges number for Pharga pallens is 8516.
