= Gabara gigantea =

Scientific classification
- Domain: Eukaryota
- Kingdom: Animalia
- Phylum: Arthropoda
- Class: Insecta
- Order: Lepidoptera
- Superfamily: Noctuoidea
- Family: Erebidae
- Genus: Gabara
- Species: G. gigantea

Binomial name
- Gabara gigantea (Smith, 1905)

Species of moth

Gabara gigantea is a species of moth in the family Erebidae. It is found in North America.

The MONA or Hodges number for Gabara gigantea is 8519.
