= Gabara pulverosalis =

Scientific classification
- Kingdom: Animalia
- Phylum: Arthropoda
- Clade: Pancrustacea
- Class: Insecta
- Order: Lepidoptera
- Superfamily: Noctuoidea
- Family: Erebidae
- Genus: Gabara
- Species: G. pulverosalis

Binomial name
- Gabara pulverosalis (Walker, 1866)

Synonyms
- Gabara minorata (J. B. Smith, 1903)

Species of moth

Gabara pulverosalis is a species of moth in the family Erebidae. The species is found in North America, including Indiana, North Carolina and Florida.

The wingspan is about 20 mm.

The larvae probably feed on wiregrass.
