= Sigela eoides =

Scientific classification
- Domain: Eukaryota
- Kingdom: Animalia
- Phylum: Arthropoda
- Class: Insecta
- Order: Lepidoptera
- Superfamily: Noctuoidea
- Family: Erebidae
- Genus: Sigela
- Species: S. eoides

Binomial name
- Sigela eoides (Barnes & McDunnough, 1913)

Species of moth

Sigela eoides, the youthful sigela moth, is a species of moth in the family Erebidae. It was first described by William Barnes and James Halliday McDunnough in 1913 and it is found in North America.

The MONA or Hodges number for Sigela eoides is 8435.
