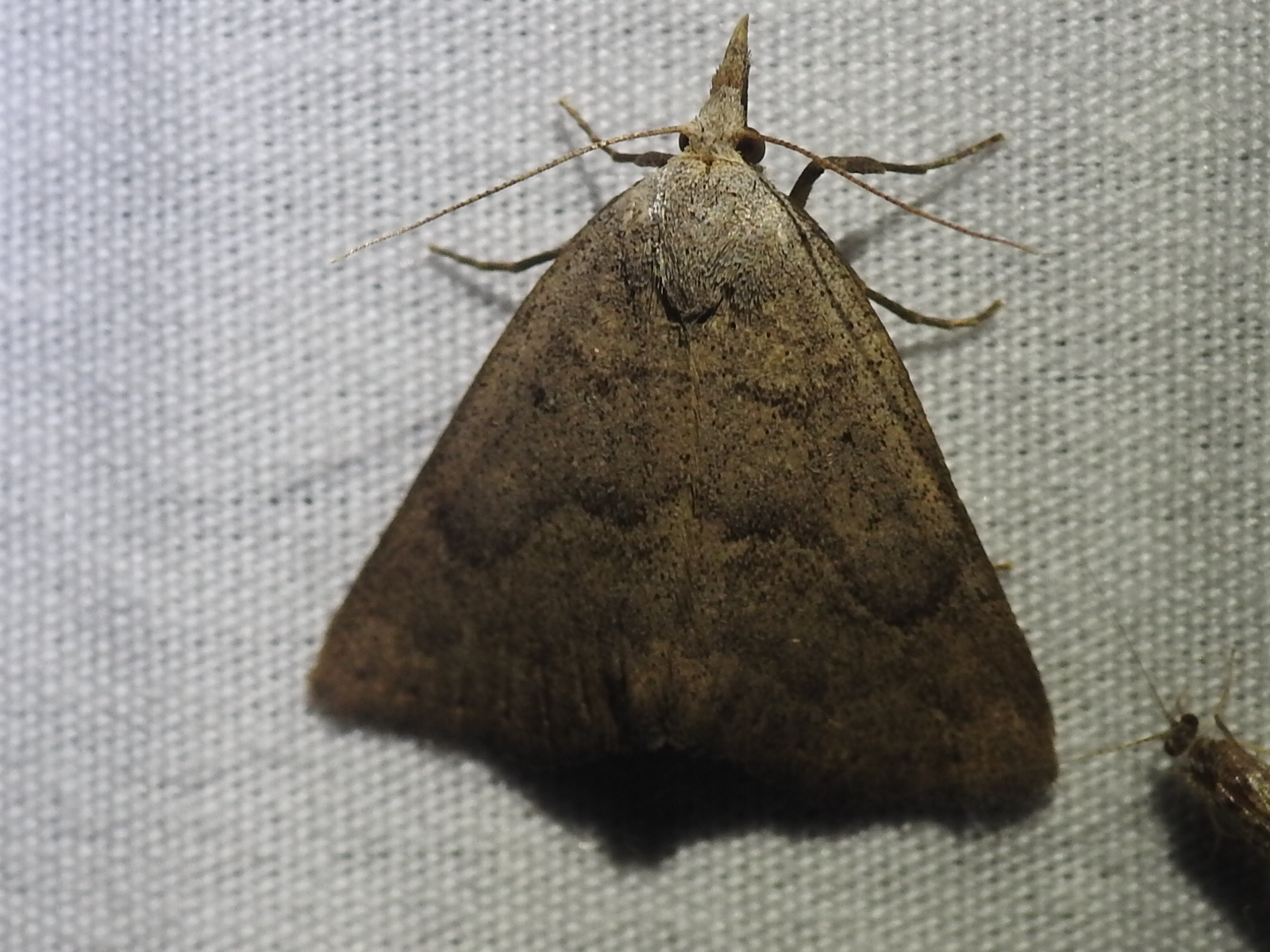

Scientific classification
- Domain: Eukaryota
- Kingdom: Animalia
- Phylum: Arthropoda
- Class: Insecta
- Order: Lepidoptera
- Superfamily: Noctuoidea
- Family: Erebidae
- Genus: Pseudorgyia
- Species: P. versuta

Binomial name
- Pseudorgyia versuta Harvey, 1875

= Pseudorgyia versuta =

Species of moth

Pseudorgyia versuta is a species of owlet moth (family Erebidae) first described by Leon F. Harvey in 1875. It is found in North America.

The MONA or Hodges number for Pseudorgyia versuta is 8512.
