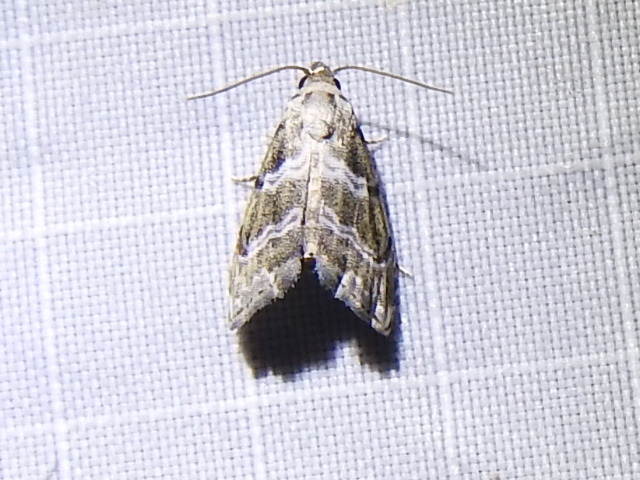

Scientific classification
- Domain: Eukaryota
- Kingdom: Animalia
- Phylum: Arthropoda
- Class: Insecta
- Order: Lepidoptera
- Superfamily: Noctuoidea
- Family: Erebidae
- Genus: Abablemma
- Species: A. bilineata

Binomial name
- Abablemma bilineata (Barnes & McDunnough, 1916)

= Abablemma bilineata =

Species of moth

Abablemma bilineata is a moth species in the family Erebidae. It was first described by William Barnes and James Halliday McDunnough in 1916 and it is found in North America.

The MONA or Hodges number for Abablemma bilineata is 8438.
