= Sigela vilhelmina =

Scientific classification
- Kingdom: Animalia
- Phylum: Arthropoda
- Clade: Pancrustacea
- Class: Insecta
- Order: Lepidoptera
- Superfamily: Noctuoidea
- Family: Erebidae
- Genus: Sigela
- Species: S. vilhelmina

Binomial name
- Sigela vilhelmina (Dyar, 1916)

Synonyms
- Araeopteron vilhemina (Dyar, 1916)

Species of moth

Sigela vilhelmina is a species of moth in the family Erebidae. It is found in North America.

The MONA or Hodges number for Sigela vilhelmina is 9081.
