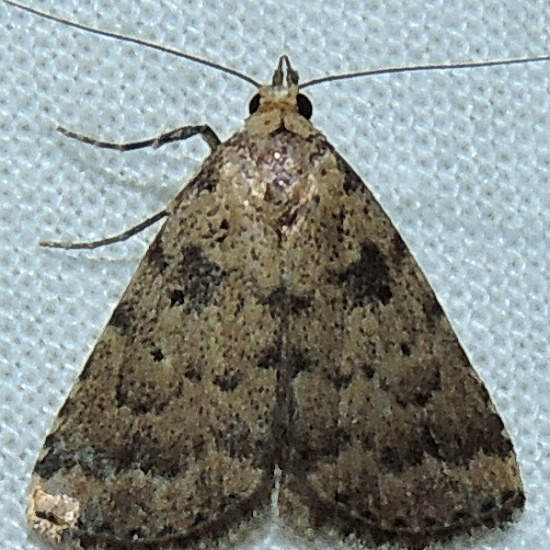
- Arugisa latiorella

Scientific classification
- Kingdom: Animalia
- Phylum: Arthropoda
- Class: Insecta
- Order: Lepidoptera
- Superfamily: Noctuoidea
- Family: Erebidae
- Subfamily: Scolecocampinae
- Genus: Arugisa; Walker, 1865

Synonyms
- Diallagma Smith, 1900

= Arugisa =

Genus of moths

Arugisa is a genus of moths in the family Erebidae.

== Taxonomy ==
The genus was previously classified in the subfamily Hypeninae of the family Noctuidae.

== Species ==
- Arugisa albipuncta Hampson, 1926
- Arugisa aliena Walker, 1865
- Arugisa gyrochila (Butler, 1879)
- Arugisa latiorella (Walker, 1863) (syn: Arugisa watsoni Richards, 1941)
- Arugisa lutea (Smith, 1900)
- Arugisa oppressa Schaus, 1911
- Arugisa punctalis (Barnes & McDunnough, 1916)
- Arugisa rubiginosa Hampson, 1926
- Arugisa subterminata Hampson, 1926
