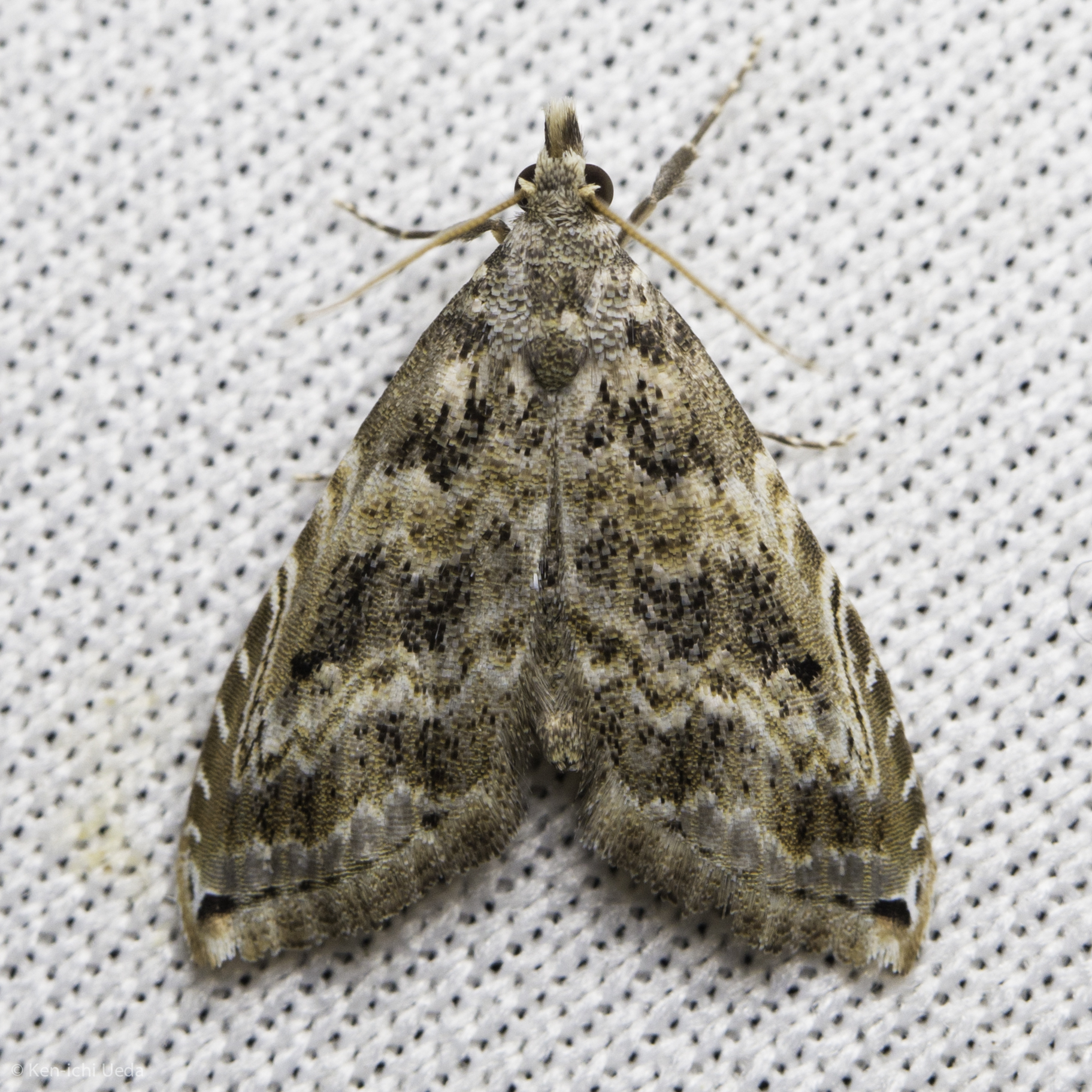
- Phobolosia anfracta

Scientific classification
- Kingdom: Animalia
- Phylum: Arthropoda
- Class: Insecta
- Order: Lepidoptera
- Superfamily: Noctuoidea
- Family: Erebidae
- Subfamily: Scolecocampinae
- Genus: Phobolosia; Dyar, 1908

= Phobolosia =

Genus of moths

Phobolosia is a genus of moths in the family Erebidae. The genus was erected by Harrison Gray Dyar Jr. in 1908.

== Taxonomy ==
The genus was previously classified in the subfamily Acontiinae of the family Noctuidae.

== Species ==
- Phobolosia admirabilis Schaus, 1914
- Phobolosia anfracta H. Edwards, 1881
- Phobolosia argentifera Hampson, 1918
- Phobolosia atrifrons Schaus, 1914
- Phobolosia aurilinea Schaus, 1912
- Phobolosia duomaculata Barnes & Benjamin, 1925
- Phobolosia medialis Hampson, 1918
- Phobolosia micralis Hampson, 1918
- Phobolosia mydronotum Dyar, 1914
