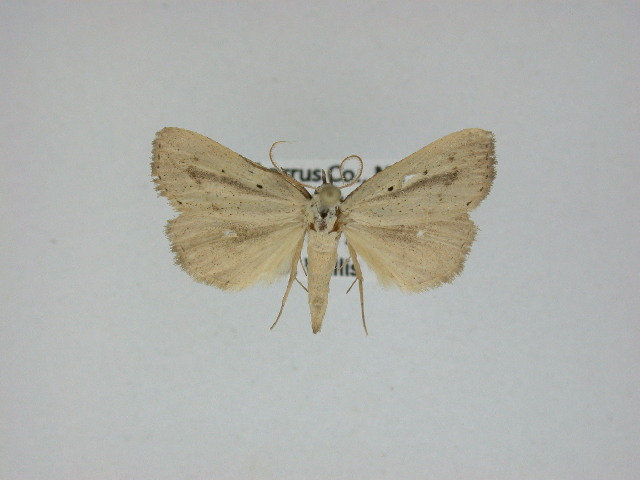
- Gabara distema

Scientific classification
- Domain: Eukaryota
- Kingdom: Animalia
- Phylum: Arthropoda
- Class: Insecta
- Order: Lepidoptera
- Superfamily: Noctuoidea
- Family: Erebidae
- Subfamily: Scolecocampinae
- Genus: Gabara; Walker, 1866

Synonyms
- Eucalyptra Morrison, 1875; Cilla Grote, 1880; Strabea Schaus, 1894; Adrocampa Schaus, 1894; Aplocampa Schaus, 1894

= Gabara (moth) =

Genus of moths

Gabara is a genus of moths in the family Erebidae. The genus was erected by Francis Walker in 1866.

== Taxonomy ==
The genus was previously classified in the subfamily Calpinae of the family Noctuidae. The genus includes the following species:

- Gabara distema Grote, 1880
- Gabara gigantea J. B. Smith, 1905
- Gabara obscura Grote, 1883
- Gabara pulverosalis Walker, 1866
- Gabara stygialis J. B. Smith, 1903 (syn.: Gabara infumata Hampson, 1926)
- Gabara subnivosella Walker, 1866
