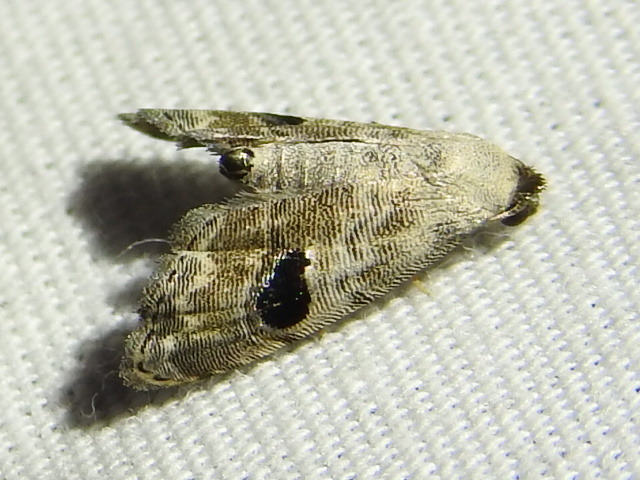
- Abablemma duomaculata, Texas

Scientific classification
- Kingdom: Animalia
- Phylum: Arthropoda
- Class: Insecta
- Order: Lepidoptera
- Superfamily: Noctuoidea
- Family: Erebidae
- Genus: Phobolosia
- Species: P. duomaculata

Binomial name
- Phobolosia duomaculata Barnes & Benjamin, 1925

Synonyms
- Abablemma duomaculata Barnes & Benjamin, 1925

= Phobolosia duomaculata =

Double-eyed algibelle

Species of moth

Phobolosia duomaculata, the double-eyed algibelle, is a moth in the family Erebidae. The species was first described by William Barnes and Foster Hendrickson Benjamin in 1925 and it is found from southern Texas, south into Mexico.

There are probably multiple generations per year.

Larvae have been reared on Physcia species, but probably also feed on other lichens.
