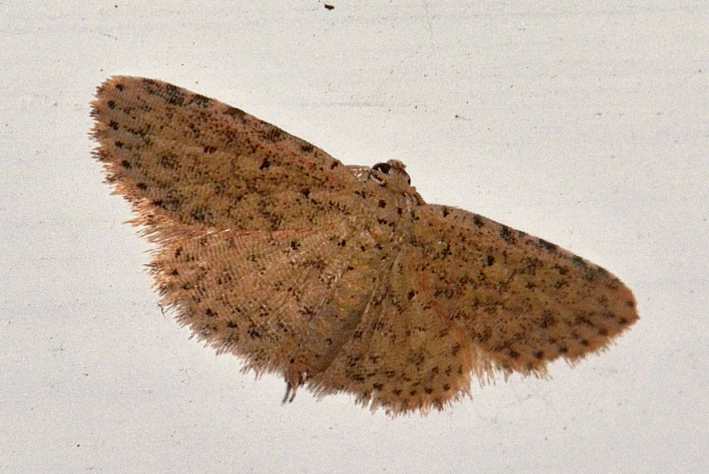

Scientific classification
- Kingdom: Animalia
- Phylum: Arthropoda
- Class: Insecta
- Order: Lepidoptera
- Superfamily: Noctuoidea
- Family: Erebidae
- Genus: Sigela
- Species: S. basipunctaria

Binomial name
- Sigela basipunctaria (Walker, 1861)

= Sigela basipunctaria =

Species of moth

Sigela basipunctaria, the spotted sigela moth, is a species of moth in the family Erebidae. It is found in North America.

The MONA or Hodges number for Sigela basipunctaria is 8434.
