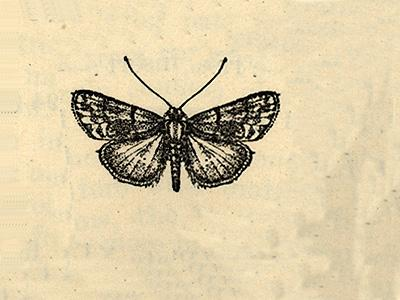

Scientific classification
- Kingdom: Animalia
- Phylum: Arthropoda
- Class: Insecta
- Order: Lepidoptera
- Superfamily: Noctuoidea
- Family: Erebidae
- Genus: Palpidia
- Species: P. melanotricha

Binomial name
- Palpidia melanotricha Hampson, 1907

= Palpidia melanotricha =

Species of moth

Palpidia melanotricha is a species of moth in the family Erebidae. The species is found in Jamaica.
